Advanced Landing Grounds (ALGs) were temporary advance airfields constructed by the Allies during World War II during the liberation of Europe. They were built in the UK prior to the invasion and thereafter in northwest Europe from 6 June 1944 to V-E Day, 7 May 1945.

Unlike the permanent airfields built in the United Kingdom and designed for the strategic bombardment of Germany, the tactical combat airfields on the continent were temporary, often improvised airfields to be used by the tactical air forces to support the advancing ground armies engaged on the battlefield. Once the front line moved out of range for the aircraft, the groups and squadrons moved up to newly built ALGs closer to the ground forces and left the ones in the rear for other support uses, or simply abandoned them.

Overview
When the Allies invaded Normandy on D-Day, Royal Air Force Airfield Construction Service engineers were among those in the initial assault waves. Their mission was to rapidly construct forward operating airfields, known as Advanced Landing Grounds (ALGs), on the European continent. As the Allied armies advanced across France and into Germany, several hundred airfields were built or rehabilitated for use by the allied air forces.

For security reasons, the airstrips were referred to by a coded number instead of location. In the United Kingdom, USAAF installations were identified by three digit (AAF) numbers ranging from AAF-101 to AAF-925. After D-Day, continental airfields in the European Theater of Operations (ETO) were also assigned coded numbers. American airfields were given A-, Y-, or R-, prefixes and numbered consecutively from 1 to 99. Both "A" and "Y" designated airfields could be found in France, however many "Y" fields would also be in Netherlands; Belgium and occupied areas of Germany. "R" coded fields were usually located in occupied Germany. British airfields on the continent were also consecutively numbered, but with a B-prefix.

The numbering system for airfields was sequentially assigned as airfields were allocated, not by location or by date of operational use. A-1, Saint Pierre du Mont, was declared operational on 13 June 1944; A-3 Cardonville on 14 June. However A-2, Cricqueville-en-Bessin, was declared operational a few days later on 19 June.

Also many of these airfields had no combat air group or squadron attached to them. They were designed for casualty evacuation and supply transport and consisted of a quickly built runway manned only by a small complement of station personnel with little or no infrastructure other than tents. As the ground forces moved east, wounded would be sent to the airfield to be picked up by C-47s and taken to hospitals in England or other rear areas. Also supplies would be airlifted to the fields and unloaded, to be quickly transported to the front line units. These were normally known as S&E Fields (Supply and Evacuation).

Once completed, airfields were usually utilised by the combat groups or squadrons within a day or so of being declared operational for military use by the IX Engineering command engineers. They would be used for perhaps a few days to a week, to several months, depending on the location, use, and operational requirements. Once the combat units moved up to the next assigned ALG, they could be utilised as S&E Fields, or deconstructed quickly and abandoned, with the land being released back to the landowners or civil authorities in the area.

Construction

The mission for constructing ALGs was placed in the hands of the Airfield Construction Service of the RAF Second Tactical Air Force, whilst the USAAF's Ninth Air Force and its specially created engineering arm, the IX Engineer Command, were responsible for ALG's in the US sector of operations. Each aviation engineer battalion in the command (of a total of sixteen) was composed of sufficient men and equipment to quickly construct an airfield or landing ground for a single tactical fighter or bomb group unit.

ALGs were selected in two ways. First, existing enemy military or civilian airfields which were captured as the ground forces advanced were noted by engineers assigned to ground units. Second, engineers noted areas in grid locations where an airfield was desired, that had flat terrain, good land drainage, and where an airfield could be constructed quickly.

Captured airfields could be restored for use as advanced landing field in one to three days depending upon the amount of damage and the number of mines and booby traps encountered.

Dry-weather advanced landing fields were constructed by a single battalion at a favourable site in flat terrain in from one to three days, including time for reconnaissance. At less favourable sites, where more clearing and grading were required, or all-weather fields which also needed additional infrastructure, the time varied from three to ten days.

ALGs were equipped with an access road that was connected to the existing road infrastructure; a dump for supplies, ammunition, and gasoline drums, along with a drinkable water and a minimal electrical grid for communications and station lighting. Tents were used for billeting and also for support facilities. Time was the all-important factor and ALGs serve its purpose if available for only a few days. As the forward area became the rear area, an advanced landing field could be improved for medium bomber use, but initially they primarily served fighter and transport groups.

Based on the experience obtained in the North African and Italian campaigns, fighter groups required an airfield 120 feet x 3600 feet long, and fighter-bomber groups required fields 120 feet x 5000 feet long. Medium bomb groups required 120 feet x 6000 feet runways.

Runway types
Instead of using rough, unimproved dirt strips, engineers used surfacing material necessary to strengthen the soil to support the weight of the aircraft and as a measure of insurance against the wet weather. Airfields were initially single runway landing strips which were laid down east–west (09/27) unless local conditions dictated a different runway direction.

Sommerfeld Tracking
ALGs laid in the UK were of Sommerfeld Tracking a form of stiffened steel wire mesh.

 Square-Mesh Track (SMT)
The surfacing material selected for the building of advanced landing grounds during the first weeks after the Normandy invasion was known as square-mesh track (SMT). SMT, a British development, was material composed of heavy wire joined in three-inch squares. It was chosen over other surfacing materials because it was very lightweight, allowing sufficient quantities to be transported across the English channel on over-tasked landing craft. Easily workable, a SMT landing mat for fighters could be laid like a carpet in about one week.

 Prefabricated Hessian (PBS)
After the initial batch of airfields was completed using SMT, the Army aviation engineers switched almost exclusively to another surfacing material known as prefabricated hessian (burlap) surfacing (PBS). Light and easily transportable, PBS did not create the dust problem encountered with SMT fields. Made of an asphalt-impregnated jute delivered in rolls 300 feet in length and 36 inches or 43 inches in width, PBS was laid in overlapping layers to produce a dust-free fair weather surface. It was also common to build airstrips using both SMT and PBS, laying SMT on top.

 Pierced Steel Plank (PSP)
To provide an all season durable airfield for the RAF's 2TAF and the USAF Ninth Air Force's medium and light bombers, a third type of surfacing material known as pierced steel plank (PSP), or Marsden Matting was introduced on the Normandy bridgehead in July 1944. Long used in other theatres, PSP would have been ideal for all airfields on the continent, but its limited availability and greater weight made this impractical. Moreover, because of supply problems, construction of even a PSP fighter-bomber field could take a month or longer, while similar PBS and SMT fields could be constructed in two weeks and one week, respectively.

In addition, Sod and Earth runways were built for Emergency Landing Strips (ELS) and Refuelling and Rearming Strips (R&R). Captured airfields contained a wide variety of runways, most commonly Asphalt; Concrete; Macadam or Tar-Penetrated Macadam.

Airfield types
There were five main types of airfields built by the USAAF combat engineers on the continent. These were:

 Emergency Landing Strips (ELS)
Consisted of a rough, graded runway approximately 2000 feet long to provide a place for emergency belly-landings of damaged aircraft.

 Supply and Evacuation (S&E)
Usually a rough graded runway near the front line or an airfield in the rear that was used by C-47s for transport of casualties to the rear, or delivery of supplies and munitions to the front line.

 Refueling and Rearming (R&R)
Consisted of a runway and an aircraft marshalling area on each end of the runway. It was designed to provide an airfield near the front lines upon which aircraft based in rear areas could land, be refuelled and rearmed, and take off again on a mission without having to return to their home field in the rear. Also could be used for dispersal or for when services other than refuelling or rearming was required. These airfields could be expanded into advance landing grounds by the addition of dispersal and other station facilities. Generally if an R&R strip was built, it would be sited wherever possible with a view to further expand it later into an ALG.

 Advanced Landing Grounds (ALG)
An advanced landing ground could be constructed as such from the beginning or by development from an R&R Strip by the addition of dispersal facilities, expansion of the road network and other additions to the station and technical area in order for it to be used over an extended period of time.

 Tactical Air Depots (TAD)
A number of ALGs were expanded into tactical air depots by the addition of hangars, shops, more dispersal hardstands, roads, and other facilities. Some were developed from the beginning.

Deployment

Four main designations were given to ALGs on the European Continent:
 "A" ALGs were located in France. They were constructed and used by Ninth Air Force units during the Invasion of Normandy (6 June – Mid July 1944) and during Operation Cobra, the break-out from Normandy, starting on 25 July 1944 until 25 August 1944. Those in Normandy were mostly decommissioned after their combat use, however others in Central France were used in various non-combat roles until the end of the war.
 "B" ALGs were built by American or British combat engineers for Royal Air Force use. Some of these were also used by USAAF Troop Carrier Groups and Command and Control organisations.
 "Y" ALGs were initially located in Southeastern France, built by Twelfth Air Force engineers as part of Operation Dragoon, the invasion of Southern France. Initially uncoded, they were given "Y" designations when they came under IX Engineering Command control in late 1944. ALGs were also coded "Y" in Northeastern France, Belgium; The Netherlands and Occupied Germany, after "A" coding reached 99 November 1944.
 "R" ALGs were located in Occupied Germany. Many more were constructed than are listed here, consisting primarily of Supply and Evacuation airfields either laid down quickly in agricultural areas or on captured Luftwaffe airfields. "R" coding began after Y-coding reached 99 in April 1945.

An unforeseen development was the extraordinary demand for transport, supply, and evacuation fields as the Allied armies pushed past Paris toward the German frontier. In late 1944, supplies could not keep pace with U.S. General Dwight D. Eisenhower's forces, and to help lessen the supply shortage airfields for C-47 Skytrain cargo planes became a priority. Bringing in ammunition of all types and especially gasoline on the trip to the ALGs on the continent, the C-47s on the return trip evacuated wounded to the rear.

By 15 September 1944, IX Engineer Command had placed over eighty ALG airfields in operation, while British engineers had constructed 76 airfields in their zone. In Southern France, another twenty or so fields had been built by American engineers from Twelfth Air Force from the Mediterranean Theater of Operations (MTO). In October these uncoded airfields were assigned to the ETO and given ALG code numbers.

The stabilisation of the front lines in the Netherlands, Belgium, and eastern France in mid-September 1944, which would last into the new year, allowed aviation engineers a chance to reorganise and prepare for the upcoming winter season. As expected, they could not build new PHS and SMI airstrips during the fall rain and winter snow seasons because of the moist ground. Besides concrete, the American-made PSP was the only available surfacing material that could be laid down during this inclement weather in Europe.

To keep the supply lines open, selected airfields in Belgium and France were therefore "winterized" with PSP. Because of the limited supply of PSP, however, only a limited number of airfields could be winterised, making it necessary to base two group sized units per airfield. But sufficient fighter-bomber and medium bomber airfields were completed that winter to ensure 2TAF and Ninth Air Force aircraft could continue flying combat missions.

The major problem affecting airfield construction in early 1945 was not the surprise German Ardennes counteroffensive (which caused the abandonment of only one airfield – Y-39, Haguenau). Rather, an early February thaw threatened to make airfields inoperable due to the mud and water. Using local civilian labour, engineers performed extensive maintenance on the threatened airfields and successfully resolved the crisis.

The renewed allied offensive in early 1945, following the Battle of the Bulge, was supported in earnest by the building of tactical airfields in occupied Germany. Trier (Y-57), became the first operational tactical American airfield on German soil on 10 March 1945. When a crossing over the Rhine River was spearheaded at Remagen, Germany, a supply and evacuation strip was quickly set up to support the bridgehead. As Allied tank columns struck out rapidly into the heartland of Germany, the airfield "clutches" of the Ninth Air Force's tactical air commands moved east of the Rhine river within range of virtually any target in Germany.

Scores of former Luftwaffe sod and hard surfaced airfields were captured in the lightning advance through Central Germany, virtually undamaged, lessening the requirement for SMT, PHS, and PSP prefabricated surfacing. The relative lack of German military opposition in late March, April and May 1945 lessened the need for close air support and produced a greater demand for supply airstrips to keep the offensive moving. Every opportunity was used to clear captured German airfields for use along the armies' route, allowing C-47s and other transports to land with food, gas, and ammunition. The supply effort received top airfield priority. By V-E Day, 9 May 1945, 76 of the 126 airfields made operational east of the Rhine river were strictly supply and evacuation fields.

Summary
USAAF Engineers constructed or rehabilitated over 280 continental airfields in the ETO from D-Day to V-E Day. In the summer months that followed, a few new airfields were constructed, but the vast majority were abandoned and turned over to local landowners or civil governments. Throughout Western Europe, as well as the airfields built by Twelfth and Fifteenth Air Forces in the MTO, a significant number were developed into permanent, civilian airports or NATO military bases after the war.

The airfield coding system remained in effect until after the Japanese surrender in the Pacific, when, on 14 September 1945, the system was officially discontinued. Thereafter, airfields were referenced by their geographic name.

Airfields
Only active combat ALGs are shown. Dedicated S&E, Liaison, Transport, and other non-combat airfields are not listed. Runway types are listed as follows:

 ASP Asphalt
 BRK Brick
 CON Concrete
 ETH Compressed Earth
 MAC Macadam

 PHS Prefabricated Hessian Surfacing
 SMT Square-Mesh Track
 SOD Sod
 PSP Pierced Steel Planking
 TAR Tar-Penetrated Macadam

Runway dimensions are in feet.

United Kingdom (Kent)

Advanced Landing Grounds were built in Kent during 1943 and 1944 for several reasons. The first being a requirement by the allies to station short-range fighters close to the English Channel coast so missions could be undertaken to attack enemy coastal fortifications; road and rail networks and other military targets in Occupied France prior to the invasion of Normandy. Also construction of the ALGs provided necessary engineering and construction training as well as providing practical experience in the development of forward airfields which would be necessary on the continent after the invasion. The ALGs laid down in Kent had two runways, while the ones laid down in France after the invasion generally had only one strip laid down east–west for speed of construction

Due to their temporary nature, the airfields were torn up and salvageable components were re-used on new ALGs in France after the assigned units were moved forward onto French ALGs after the invasion of Normandy.

Normandy campaign

Airfields in France used in support of the invasion and establishment of Allied forces in Normandy, France, during Operation Overlord and the immediate aftermath, 6 June – 24 July 1944

 A-9 Le Molay-Littry (Le Molay), France
 Located:   
 Opened: 30 June 1944 Closed: 5 October 1944
 Runway: 4000x120, SMT (04/22)
 Used by:
 67th Tactical Reconnaissance Group, July – August 1944 (F-4/P-38; F-5/P-51)
 12th Tactical Reconnaissance Squadron, 5 July – 11 August 1944 (F-5/P-51)

 A-11 Saint-Lambert, France
 Located: 
 Opened: 5 August 1944 Closed: 11 September 1944
 Runway: 5000x120, PHS (05/23)
 Used by:
 474th Fighter Group, 6–29 August 1944 (P-38)

 A-12 Lignerolles, France
 Located:  (abandoned)
 Opened: 18 July 1944 Closed: 4 November 1944
 Runway: 5000x120, PHS (07/25)
 Used by:
 362d Fighter Group, 2 July – 10 August 1944 (P-47)
 365th Fighter Group, 15 August – 3 September 1944 (P-47)

 A-13 Tour-en-Bessin, France
 Located:   
 Opened: 28 July 1944 Closed: 2 December 1944
 Runway 1: 5000x120, PSP (12/30)
 Runway 2: 5000x120, PSP (01/19)
 Used by:
 373d Fighter Group, 19 July – 19 August 1944 (P-47)
 406th Fighter Group, 5–17 August 1944 (P-47)
 394th Bombardment Group, 25 August – 18 September 1944 (Martin B-26 Marauder)

 A-21 Saint-Laurent-sur-Mer, France
 Located: 
 Opened: 8 June – 25 August 1944
 Runway: 3400x120, ETH (11/28)
 Used as: Casualty evacuation and transport Airfield (IX Service Command)

 A-22 Colleville-sur-Mer, France
 Located:   
 Opened: 13 July – 4 November 1944
 Runway: 3750x120, PBS (09/27)
 Used as: Transport Airfield

Cotentin Peninsula/Brittany Breakout

 ELS Avranches, France
 Located:  
 Established: 8 August 1944: Closed: (Undetermined)
 Runway: 3600x120 SOD (05/23)
 Emergency Landing Strip

 A-7 Azeville, France
 Located:   
 Opened: 24 June 1944 Closed: 15 September 1944
 Runway: 3600x120, SMT (08/26)
 Used by:
 365th Fighter Group, 28 June – 15 August 1944 (P-47)
 363d Fighter Group, August – September 1944 (P-51)

 A-8 Picauville, France
 Located:   
 Opened: 26 June 1944 Closed: 15 September 1944
 Runway: 5000x120, PHS (07/25)
 Used by:
 405th Fighter Group, 30 June – 14 September 1944 (P-47)

 A-10 Carentan, France
 Located: 
 Opened: 16 June 1944 Closed: 4 November 1944
 Runway: 5000x120, PHS (08/26)
 Used by:
 50th Fighter Group, 25 June – 16 August 1944 (P-47)
 392d Fighter Squadron, 22 July – 14 August 1944 (P-38)

 A-14 Cretteville, France
 Located:  
 Opened: 4 July 1944 Closed: 5 September 1944
 Runway: 5000x120, (3600 PHS/1400 ETH) (04/22)
 Used by:
 358th Fighter Group, 3 July – 14 August 1944 (P-47)
 406th Fighter Group, 17 August – 4 September 1944 (P-47)

 A-15 Maupertus-sur-Mer (Maupertus), France
 Located: 
 Now: Cherbourg - Maupertus Airport or Aéroport de Cherbourg – Maupertus 
 Opened: 4 July 1944 Closed: 22 December 1944
 Runway 1: 6000x120, PSP (11/29)
 Runway 2: 5000x120, PSP (17/35)
 Used by: 
 363d Fighter Group, 9 July – August 1944 (P-38)
 387th Bombardment Group, 22 August – 18 September 1944 (B-26)
 422d Night Fighter Squadron, 25 July – 28 August 1944 (P-61)

 A-16 Brucheville, France
 Located:   
 Opened: 2 August 1944 Closed: 5 September 1944
 Runway: 5000x120, (3600 PHS/1400 ETH) (07/25)
 Used by:
 36th Fighter Group, 4 July – 25 August 1944 (P-47)

 A-17 Méautis, France
 Located:  
 Opened: 17 August 1944 Closed: 7 September 1944
 Runway: 5000x120, (3600 PHS/1400 ETH) (10/28)
 Used by:
 50th Fighter Group, 16 August – 4 September 1944 (P-47)

 A-18 Saint-Jean-de-Daye, France
 Located:  
 Opened: 29 August 1944 Closed: 9 September 1944
 Runway: 5000x120, (3600 PHS/1400 ETH) (06/24)
 Emergency Landing/Refueling Field

 A-19 Saint-Georges d' Elle (50) (La Vieille), France
 Located: 
 Opened: 14 August 1944 Closed: 7 September 1944
 Runway: 5000x120, (3600 PHS/1400 ETH) (01/19)
 Used by:
 370th Fighter Group, 15 August – 6 September 1944 (P-38)

 A-20 Lessay, France
 Located: 
 Now: Lessay Airport 
 Opened: 25 August 1944 Closed: 28 September 1944
 Runway 1: 6000x120, PSP (06/24)
 Runway 2: 5000x120, PSP (12/30)
 Used by:
 323d Bombardment Group, 26 August – 21 September 1944 (B-26)

 A-23 Querqueville, France
 Located: 
 Opened: 6 July – 8 August 1945
 Runway: 4600x120, PSP (10/28)
 Used by:  Detachment, 27th Air Transport Group (ATC)

 A-24 Biniville, France
 Located: 
 Opened: 17 July – 21 August 1944
 Runway: 3600x120, ETH (04/22)
 Used by: Detachment, 125th Liaison Squadron

 A-25 Bolleville, France
 Located:  
 Opened: 7 August 1944 – 3 March 1945
 Runway: 3932x120, SMT & PBS (11/29)
 Used as:  Transport Airfield

 A-26 Gorges, France
 Located:   
 Opened: 16 August 1944 Closed: 28 September 1944
 Runway: 6000x120, PSP (07/25)
 Used by: 
 397th Bombardment Group, 11 August – September 1944 (B-26)

 A-27 Rennes/St-Jacques, France
 Located: 
 Now: Rennes - Saint-Jacques Airport 
 Captured 7 August 1944 Opened: 10 August 1944 Closed: 30 November 1944
 Runway 1: 5593x260, CON (10/28)
 Runway 2: 4676x260, CON (14/32)
 Used by:
 362d Fighter Group, 10 August – 19 September 1944 (P-47)
 10th Reconnaissance Group, 11 August – September 1944 (P-38/F-5; P-51/F-6)

 A-29 Saint-James, France
 Located: 
 Opened: 14 August 1944 Closed: 28 September 1944
 Runway: 5000x120, PHS (13/31)
 Used by:
 373d Fighter Group, 19 August – 19 September 1944 (P-47)

 A-30 Courtils, France
 Located:  (approximately)
 Opened: 13 August – 5 September 1944
 Runway: 3600x120, ETH (10/28)
 Used as: Transport Airfield

 A-31 Gaël, France
 Located: 
 Captured: 10 August 1944 Opened: 11 August 1944 Closed: 28 September 1944
 Runway: 4500x120, SOD/ETH (08/26)
 Used by:
 354th Fighter Group, 13 August – 17 September 1944 (P-51)

 A-32 Nantes/Chateau-Bougcn, France
 Construction Cancelled

 A-33 Vannes, France
 Located: 
 Now: Meucon Airport 
 Captured 10 August 1944 Opened: 29 August 1944 Closed: 20 June 1945
 Runway 1: 6000X200, CON/TAR (13/31)
 Runway 2: 4400x200, CON/TAR (04/22)
 Used by:
 425th Night Fighter Squadron, 18 August – 11 September 1944 (P-61)

 A-51 Morlaix, France
 Located: 
 Opened: 1 September – 8 November 1944 
 Runway: 40500x120 CON (05/23)
 Use: Transport Airfield

Northern France Campaign
The US marks the "Northern France Campaign" from the break-out following the invasion of Normandy to September 1944.

Drive to the Seine River 

 A-28 Pontorson, France
 Located:   
 Opened: 10 August 1944 Closed: 28 September 1944
 Runway: 5000x120, (3600 PHS/1400 ETH) (08/26)
 Used by:
 358th Fighter Group, 14 August – 14 September 1944 (P-47)

 A-35 Le Mans, France
 Located: 
 Captured: 12 August 1944 Opened: 3 September 1944 Closed: 20 November 1944
 Runway: 5000x120, PHS (14/32)
 Used by:
 36th Fighter Group, 25 August – September 1944 (P-47)
 440th Troop Carrier Group, 30 September – 2 November 1944 (C-47)

 A-34 Gorron, France
 Located:  (approximately)
 Opened: 27 August – 4 November 1944
 Runway: 3600x120, ETH (08/26)
 Used as: Emergency Landing/Refueling Airfield

 A-37 Lombron, France
 Located:  (approximately)
 Opened: 3–28 September 1944
 Runway: 5000x120, PBS (08/26)
 Used as: Emergency Landing/Refueling Airfield

 A-38 Montreuil, France
 Located: 
 Opened: 4 September 1944 Closed: 5 October 1944
 Runway: 5000x120, (3600 PHS/1400 ETH) (01/19)
 Used by:
 363d Tactical Reconnaissance Group, 4 September – October 1944

 A-39 Châteaudun, France
 Located: 
 Now: Châteaudun Airport 
 Also   Châteaudun Air Base (BA 279)
 Captured 20 August 1944 Opened: 26 August 1944 Closed: 8 August 1945
 Runway 1: 7250x262, CON (10/28)
 Runway 2: 5600x262, CON (05/23)
 Used by: 
 10th Reconnaissance Group, November 1944 (P-38/F-5; P-51/F-6)
 422d Night Fighter Squadron, 28 August – 16 September 1944 (P-61)
 387th Bombardment Group, 18 September – 30 October 1944 (B-26)
 439th Troop Carrier Group, 4 November 1944 – 7 September 1945 (C-47)

 A-40 Chartres, France
 Located: 
 Now: Chartres-Champhol Airport 
 Captured 21 August 1944 Opened: 26 August 1944 Closed: Undetermined
 Runway: 5500x260, CON/PSP (08/26)
 Used by:
 368th Fighter Group, 23 August – 11 September 1944 (P-47)
 323d Bombardment Group, 21 September – 13 October 1944 (B-26)

 A-41 Dreux/Vernouillet, France
 Located: 
 Now: Vernouillet Airport 
 Captured 21 August 1944 Opened: 26 August 1944 Closed: Undetermined
 Runway 1: 5500x200, CON/PSP (02/20)
 Runway 2: 4400x200, CON (12/30)
 Used by:
 366th Fighter Group, 24 August – 8 September 1944
 397th Bombardment Group, 11 September – 6 October 1944
 441st Troop Carrier Group, 3 November 1944 – 12 August 1945

 A-42 Vélizy-Villacoublay (Villacoublay), France
 Also known as AAF-180
 Located: 
 Now:  Vélizy - Villacoublay Air Base (IATA code XIY) (ICAO code LFPV) (BA 107)
 Captured 27 August 1944 Opened: 30 August 1944 Closed: August 1946
 Runway : 4000x200, CON/TAR (13/31)
 Used by:
 48th Fighter Group, 29 August – 15 September 1944

 A-43 Saint-Marceau, France
 Located: 
 Opened: 31 August 1944 Closed: 20 November 1944
 Runway : 5000x120, PHS (08/26)
 Used by:
 474th Fighter Group, 29 August – 6 September 1944
 441st Troop Carrier Group, 2 October – 3 November 1944

 A-44 Peray, France
 Located:  
 Opened: 2 September 1944 Closed: 20 November 1944
 Runway : 5000x120, PHS (10/28)
 Used by:
 367th Fighter Group, 4–8 September 1944
 442d Troop Carrier Group, 5 October – 7 November 1944

 A-45 Lonrai (Lonray), France
 Located: 
 Opened: 3 September 1944 Closed: 20 November 1944
 Runway : 5000x120, PHS (05/23)
 Used by:
 370th Fighter Group, 6–11 September 1944
 439th Troop Carrier Group, 28 September – 4 November 1944

 A-46 Toussus-le-Noble, France
 Also known as: AAF-384
 Located: 
 Now: Toussus-le-Noble Airport 
 Captured: 26 August 1944 Opened: 28 August 1944 Closed: 8 August 1945
 Runway : 4070x106, SMT (07/25)
 Used by:
 67th Tactical Reconnaissance Group, August – September 1944

 A-47 Orly, France
 Located: 
 Now: Paris-Orly Airport 
 Captured 27 August 1944 Opened: 28 August 1944 Closed: Undetermined
 Runway 1: 6137x197, CON (02/20)
 Runway 2: 5170x197, CON (08/26)
 Used by:
 50th Fighter Group, 4–15 September 1944

 A-48 Brétigny, France
 Located: 
 Now:   Brétigny-sur-Orge Air Base (BA 217)
 Captured 27 August 1944 Opened: 29 August 1944 Closed: 8 August 1945
 Runway 1: 5100x197, CON/PSP (04/22)
 Runway 2: 4880x197, CON/PSP (11/29)
 Used by:
 404th Fighter Group, 29 August – 13 September 1944
 365th Fighter Group, 3–15 September 1944
 409th Bombardment Group, September 1944 – February 1945
 435th Troop Carrier Group, 13 February – 25 June 1945

 A-49 Beille, France
 Located: 
 Opened: 15 August – 25 September 1944
 Runway: 3600x150, SOD (07/25)
 Use: Transport Airfield

 A-50 Orleans/Bricy, France
 Located: 
 Now:   Orléans - Bricy Air Base (BA 123) 
 Captured 22 August 1944 Opened: 24 August 1944 Closed: Undetermined
 Runway : 7788x263, CON (07/25)
 Used by:
 394th Bombardment Group, 18 September – 8 October 1944
 440th Troop Carrier Group, 2 November 1944 – 18 October 1945

 A-53 Issy les Moulineaux, France
 Located: 
 Opened: 29 August – 5 December 1944
 Runway: 2100x120 SOD (05/23)
 Use: Liaison Airfield

 A-57 Laval, France
 Located: 
 Opened: 21 August – 5 December 1944
 Runway 1: 3450x120 SOD (13/31)
 Runway 2: 2400x120 SOD (04/22)
 Use: Liaison Airfield

Pursuit to the German border 

 A-36 Saint-Léonard, France
 Located:   
 Opened: 4 September 1944 Closed: 28 September 1944
 Runway: 5000x120, (3600 PHS/1400 ETH) (00/18)
 Used by:
 406th Fighter Group, 4–22 September 1944 (P-47)

 A-52 Étampes/Mondesir, France
 Located: 
 Opened: 30 August – 25 September 1944
 Runway: 4500x120 SOD (06/24)
 Use: Transport Airfield

 A-54 Le Bourget, France
 Located: 
 Now: Le Bourget Airport 
 Opened: 29 August 1944 – 1 May 1946
 Runway 1: 4730x201 CON (08/26)
 Runway 2: 4700x120 SOD (01/19)
 Use: 27th Air Transport Group (ATC)

 A-55 Melun/Villaroche, France
 Located: 
 Now: Melun-Villaroche Airport 
 Captured: 1 September 1944 Opened: 15 September 1944 Closed: 8 August 1945
 Runway 1: 5336x200, CON (01/19)
 Runway 2: 5376x200, ASP (10/29)
 Used by:
 416th Bombardment Group, September 1944 – February 1945 (A-20)
 436th Troop Carrier Group, 21 February – 15 July 1945 (C-47)

 A-56 Le Hamil, France
 Located: 
 Opened: 27 August – 15 September 1944
 Runway: 3000x120 ETH (04/22)
 Use: Liaison Airfield

 A-58 Coulommiers/Voisins, France
 Located: 
 Now: Coulommiers-Voisins Airport 
 Captured: 1 September 1944 Opened: 8 September 1944 Closed: 8 August 1945
 Runway 1: 6565x264, CON (09/28)
 Runway 2: 6000x264, ASP (04/22)
 Used by: 
 425th Night Fighter Squadron, 11 September – 13 October 1944 (P-61)
 410th Bombardment Group, September 1944 – February 1945 (A-20)
 437th Troop Carrier Group, 24 February – 28 July 1945 (C-47)

 A-59 Cormeilles-En-Vexin, France
 Located: 
 Now: Pontoise - Cormeilles-en-Vexin Airport 
 Captured: 6 September 1944 Opened: 15 September 1944 Closed: 8 August 1945
 Runway : 6413x165, CON (12/30)
 Used by:
 344th Bombardment Group, 30 September 1944 – 5 April 1945 (B-26/A-26)

 A-60 Beaumont-sur-Oise, France
 Located: 
 Now: Persan-Beaumont Airport 
 Captured: 3 September 1944 Opened: 26 September 1944 Closed: 17 July 1945
 Runway : 5250x164, CON (05/23)
 Used by:
 386th Bombardment Group, 2 October 1944 – 9 April 1945 (B-26)
 410th Bombardment Group, May – June 1945 (A-26)

 A-61 Beauvais/Tille, France (B-42 by Royal Air Force)
 Pre war French airfield occupied by Luftwaffe in 1940. 
Located: 
 Now: Beauvais–Tillé Airport ("Paris-Beauvais") 
 Captured: 6 September 1944 Opened: 10 September 1944 Returned to French control 17 August 1945
 Runway 1: 6023x164, CON (12/30)
 Runway 2: 5510x164, CON (04/22)
 Used by:
 322d Bombardment Group, September 1944 – March 1945 (B-26)

 A-62 Reims/Champagne, France
 Located: 
 Now:   Reims - Champagne Air Base  (BA 112)
 Pre-war French airbase. Captured from German forces on 30 August 1944. Opened: 3 September 1944 Returned tp French control at end of war
 Runway 1: 5000x100, PSP (05/23)
 Runway 2: 5000x120, SOD (06/24)
 Used by:
 440th Troop Carrier Group, 11–30 September 1944 (C-47)
 373d Fighter Group, 19 September – 22 October 1944 (P-47)

 A-63 Villeneuve/Vertus, France
 Located: 
 Opened: 5 September 1944 Closed: 23 May 1945
 Runway : 3600x150, SOD (07/25)
 Used by:
 441st Troop Carrier Group, 8 September – 2 October 1944

 A-64 Saint-Dizier/Robinson, France
 Located: 
 Now:   Saint-Dizier - Robinson Air Base (BA 113)
 Captured: 7 September 1944 Opened: 10 September 1944 Closed: 7 May 1945
 Runway 1: 5500x262, CON/PSP (12L/30R)
 Runway 2: 4678x198, CON (12R/30L)
 Used by:
 10th Reconnaissance Group, September – November 1944 (P-38/F-5; P-51/F-6)
 405th Fighter Group, 14 September – February 1945 (P-47)
 367th Fighter Group, 1 February – 14 March 1945 (P-38)
 27th Fighter Bomber Group, 22 February – 19 March 1945 (North American A-36) (12th AF)
 415th Night Fighter Squadron, 18 March – 17 April 1945 (Northrop P-61 Black Widow)
 417th Night Fighter Squadron, 5–24 April 1945 (P-61)

 A-65 Perthes, France
 Located: 
 Opened: 9 September 1944 Closed: 5 October 1944
 Runway : 5000x120, SOD (10/28)
 Used by:
 371st Fighter Group, 18 September – 1 October 1944 (P-47)

 A-66 Orconte, France
 Located: 
 Opened: 15 September 1944 Closed: 1 December 1944
 Runway : 5000x120, PHS (11/29)
 Used by:
 354th Fighter Group, 17 September – 1 December 1944 (P-47)

 A-67 Vitry-En-Artois (Vitry), France
 Located: 
 Captured: 9 September 1944 Now: Vitry-En-Artois Airport 
 Opened: 15 September 1944 Closed: 18 December 1945
 Runway : 5000x120, PHS (09/27)
 Used by:
 358th Fighter Group, 14 September – 16 October 1944 (P-47)

 A-68 Juvincourt-et-Damary (Juvincourt), France
 Located:  (abandoned)
 Captured: 5 September 1944 Opened: 7 September 1944 Closed: 2 July 1945
 Runway 1: 5500x160, CON (09/27)
 Runway 2: 5420x160, CON (17/35)
 Used by:
 439th Troop Carrier Group, 8–28 September 1944 (C-47)
 404th Fighter Group, 13 September – 4 October 1944 (P-47)
 365th Fighter Group, 15 September – 4 October 1944 (P-47)
 36th Fighter Group, 1–27 October 1944 (P-47)
 367th Fighter Group, 28 October 1944 – 1 February 1945 (P-38)
 368th Fighter Group, 27 December 1944 – 5 January 1945 (P-47)
 410th Bombardment Group, February – May 1945 (A-20)

 A-69 Laon/Athies, France
 Located: 
 Waa: Laon-Athies Air Base (abandoned)
 Captured 7 September 1944 Opened: 10 September 1944 Closed: 23 May 1945
 Runway : 5386x163, CON (08/26)
 Used by:
 368th Fighter Group, 11 September – 2 October 1944 (P-47)
 323d Bombardment Group, 13 October 1944 – February 1945 (B-26)
 416th Bombardment Group, February – May 1945 (A-20)

 A-70 Laon/Couvron, France
 Located: 
 Now:   Quartier Mangin sur l'ancienne base de Couvron (Armée de Terre)
 Captured 7 September 1944 Opened: 9 September 1944 Closed: 23 May 1945
 Runway 1: 5450x167, CON (02/20)
 Runway 2: 5350x167, CON (10/28)
 Used by:
 50th Fighter Group, 15–28 September 1944 (P-47)
 409th Bombardment Group, February – June 1945

 A-71 Clastres, France
 Located: 
 Now: Saint-Simon - Clastres Air Base abandoned)
 Captured: 7 September Opened: 9 September 1944 Closed: Unknown
 Runway 1: 5730x164, CON (05/23)
 Runway 2: 5963x164, CON (10/29)
 Used by:
 367th Fighter Group, 8 September – 28 October 1944 (P-38)
 387th Bombardment Group, 30 October 1944 – 29 April 1945 (B-26)

 A-72 Peronne/St Quentin, France
 Located: 
 Now: Peronne-St Quentin Airport 
 Captured: 5 September Opened: 6 September 1944 Closed: Unknown
 Runway 1: 5250x164, CON (04/22)
 Runway 2: 5400x164, CON (09/27)
 Used by:
 474th Fighter Group, 6 September – 1 October 1944 (P-38)
 397th Bombardment Group, 6 October 1944 – 25 April 1945 (B-26)

 A-73 Roye/Amy, France
 Located:  (abandoned)
 Captured: 6 September Opened: 8 September 1944 Closed: 8 August 1945
 Runway 1: 5600x164, CON (05/23)
 Runway 2: 5965x164, CON (10/28)
 Used by:
 370th Fighter Group, 11–26 September 1944 (P-47)
 391st Bombardment Group, 19 September 1944 – 16 April 1945 (B-26)
 349th Troop Carrier Group, 13 April – July 1945 (C-47)

 A-74 Cambrai/Niergnies, France
 Located: 
 Now: Cambrai-Niergnies Airport 
 Captured: 10 September Opened: 12 September 1944 Closed: Unknown
 Runway 1: 5330x164, CON/PSP (15/33)
 Runway 2: 5068x164, CON/TAR (09/27)
 Used by:
 48th Fighter Group, 15–30 September 1944 (P-47)
 394th Bombardment Group, 6 October 1944 – 2 May 1945 (B-26)

 A-75 Cambrai/Epinoy, France
 Also known as B-72 (Royal Air Force)
 Located: 
 Opened: 12–16 September 1944
 Runway 1: 5300x165 CON (05/23)
 Runway 2: 5425x165 CON/PSP (17/35)
 Operated as: Emergency Landing/Refueling Airfield

 A-76 Athis, France
 Located:  (abandoned)
 Captured: Opened: 4 September 1944 Closed: 4 October 1945
 Runway : 5600x120, SMT (09/27)
 Used by:
 36th Fighter Group, 1 September – October 1944 (P-47)

 A-77 Sainte-Livière, France
 Located:  
 Opened: 11 September – 10 May 1944
 Runway: 3600x120 SOD (13/31)
 Operated as: Transport Airfield

 A-79 Prosnes, France
 Located:  (abandoned)
 Opened: 21 September 1944 Closed: 4 July 1945
 Runway : 6000x120, PSP (08/26)
 Used by: 
 362d Fighter Group, 19 September – 5 November 1944 (P-47)
 425th Night Fighter Squadron, 13 October – 9 November 1944 (P-61)
 438th Troop Carrier Group, February – May 1945 (C-47)

 A-80 Mourmelon-le-Grand, France
 Located:  (abandoned)
 Opened: 20 September 1944 Closed: 2 July 1945
 Runway : 6000x120, PSP (08/26)
 Used by:
 406th Fighter Group, 22 September 1944 – 2 February 1945 (P-47)
 358th Fighter Group, 16 October – 9 November 1944 (P-47)
 434th Troop Carrier Group, 24 March – July 1945 (C-47)

 A-81 Creil, France
 Located:  
 Now:   BA 110 Creil Air Base
 Opened:  23 September 1944 – 8 May 1945
 Runway 1: 5646x164 CON (07/25)
 Runway 2: 5382x164 CON (14/32)
 Use:  1st Transport Group (Provisional) (ATC)

 A-82 Verdun/Etain, France
 Located: 
 Later: Étain-Rouvres Air Base 
 Opened: 19 September 1944 Closed: 22 May 1945
 Runway: 5000x120, PSP, (08/26)
 Used by:
 362d Fighter Group, 5 November 1944 – 8 April 1945 (P-47)
 425th Night Fighter Squadron, 9 November 1944 – 12 April 1945 (P-61)

 A-83 Denain/Prouvy, France
 Also known as: B-74 (Royal Air Force)
 Located: 
 Now: Valenciennes-Denain Airport 
 Captured: 12 September
 Opened: 14 September 1944 Closed: 25 June 1945
 Runway: 5500x164, CON/PSP, (06/24)
 Used by:
 323d Bombardment Group, 15 February – May 1945 (B-26)

 A-88 Maubeuge, France
 Located:  
 Opened: 9 November 1944 – 13 February 1945 
 Runway: 3600x150 SOD (05/23)
 Use:  Transport Airfield

 A-90 Toul-Croix De Metz Airfield, France
 Located: 
 Now: Non-Aviation use (Industrial Estate)
 Captured: 14 September 1944 Opened: 14 September 1944 Closed: 22 May 1945
 Runway: 5000x120, PSP, (10/28)
 Used by:
 358th Fighter Group, 9 November 1944 – 2 April 1945 (P-47)

 A-91 Sedan, France
 Located:  
 Opened:  14 September 1944 – 17 May 1945
 Runway 1: 3600x120 SOD (07/25) 
 Runway 2: 3600x120 SOD (08/26)
 Use:  Transport Airfield

 A-94 Conflans-en-Jarnisy (Conflans), France
 Located:  
 Now: Doncourt-lès-Conflans Airport 
 Opened: 20 November 1944 Closed: 22 May 1945
 Runway: 5000x120, PSP, (08/26)
 Used by:
 10th Reconnaissance Group, November 1944 – March 1945 (P-38/F-4; P-51/F-5)
 367th Fighter Group, 14 March – 20 April 1945 (P-38)

 A-95 Nancy/Azelot, France
 Located:   
 Opened: 31 October 1944 – 5 November 1945 
 Runway:  5000x120 PSP (01/19)
 Use: 
 XIX TAC Provisional Reconnaissance Group (November 1944 – April 1945)
 162d Tactical Reconnaissance Squadron
 111th Tactical Reconnaissance Squadron 
 69th Tactical Reconnaissance Group (March – April 1945)

 A-96 Toul/Ochey, France
 Located:   
 Now:   Nancy - Ochey Air Base (BA 133)
 Opened: 9 October 1944 Closed: 11 May 1945
 Runway: 5000x120, PSP, (07/25)
 Used by: 
 50th Fighter Group, 3 November 1944 – 20 April 1945 (P-47)
 415th Night Fighter Squadron, 30 November 1944 – 18 March 1945 (P-61)
 27th Fighter Bomber Group, 19 March – April 1945 (P-47) (12th AF)

 A-98 Rosieres En Haye, France
 Located: 
 Now:   Toul-Rosières Air Base (BA 136)
 Opened: 21 November 1944 Closed: 22 May 1945
 Runway: 5000x120, PSP, (03/21)
 Used by:
 354th Fighter Group, 1 December 1944 – 8 April 1945

 A-99 Mars-la-Tour, France
 Located:  
 Opened:  28 September 1944 – 2 January 1945
 Runway: 3600x120 SOD (04/22)
 Use: Transport Airfield

 Y-1 Tantonville, France
 Located: 
 Opened: 25 December 1944 Closed: 29 May 1945
 Runway: 5000/120, PSP, (02/20)
 Used by:
 371st Fighter Group, 20 December 1944 – 15 February 1945 (P-47)
 86th Fighter Group, 20 February – 17 April 1945 (P-47) (12th AF)

 Y-2 Luneville, France
 Located: 
 Now: Lunéville-Croismare Airport 
 Opened: January 1945 Closed: 29 May 1945
 Runway: 5000/120, PSP, (09/27)
 Used by:
 324th Fighter Group, 4 January – 8 May 1945 (P-47) (12th AF)

 Y-3 Avril, France
 Construction cancelled

 Y-4 Buc, France
 Located: 
 Opened:  28 August 1944 – 5 December 1945 
 Runway 1: 3300x120 SOD (07/25) 
 Runway 2: 3300x120 SOD (13/31)
 Use:
 109th Tactical Reconnaissance Squadron, August – September 1944
 47th Liaison Squadron, September 1944
 112th Liaison Squadron, September 1944 – June 1945

 Y-28 Verdun/Charny, France
 Located:  (approximately)
 Opened:  11 September 1944 – 25 June 1945
 Runway:  3000/80 SMT (01/19)
 Use: Liaison Airfield

 Y-31 Bulgnéville, France
 Located:   (approximately)
 Opened:  4 November 1944 – 6 January 1945
 Runway 1: 4500x125 SOD (09/27)
 Runway 2: 4100x120 PSP (06/24)
 Use: Liaison Airfield

 Y-33 Thionville, France
 Located:  (approximately) 
 Opened: 29 November 1944 – 16 June 1945 
 Runway: 3600x120 PSP (02/20)
 Use:  Transport Airfield/Tactical Air Depot

 Y-34 Metz, France
 Located: 
 Now:   Metz-Frescaty Air Base (BA 128)
 Opened: 25 December 1944 Closed: 29 May 1945
 Runway: 5000x120, PSP, (02/20)
 Used by:
 365th Fighter Group, 27 December 1944 – 30 January 1945 (P-47)
 368th Fighter Group, 5 January – 15 April 1945 (P-47)
 406th Fighter Group, 2–8 February 1945 (P-47)
 371st Fighter Group, 15 February – 7 April 1945 (P-47)

 Y-35 Compiegne/Margny, France
 Now: Compiègne - Margny Airport 
 Located:  
 Opened:  15 December 1944 – 30 May 1945
 Runway 1: 3000x120 SMT (05/23)
 Runway 2: 3300x120 SMT (12/30)
 Runway 3: 3500x100 PSP (14/32)
 Use:  Transport Airfield

 Y-39 Haguenau, France
 Located:   
 Now: Haguenau Airport 
 Opened: 20 December 1944 Closed: 17 July 1945
 Runway 1: 3400x160, CON, (07/25)
 Runway 2: 3200x180, CON, (03/21)
 Used by:
 69th Reconnaissance Group, 2 April – 30 June 1945 (P-38/F-4; P-51/F-5)

 Y-42 Nancy/Essey, France
 Now: Nancy-Essey Airport 
 Located: 
 Opened: 15 October 1944 – 30 September 1945 
 Runway 1: 3000/100 SOD (15/33)
 Runway 2: 3600/100 PSP (08/26)
 Use: 
 14th Liaison Squadron, October – December 1944
 Headquarters: 71st Fighter Wing, 16 July – 25 September 1945

Southern France Campaign

 Y-5 Ambérieu-en-Bugey (Ambérieu), France
 Located: 
 Now:   Ambérieu-en-Bugey Air Base (BA 278)
 Opened:  September 1944 Closed: 29 May 1945
 Constructed by MTO (12AF) Engineers
 Runway: 6000/100, ETH, (01/19)
 Used by:
 324th Fighter Group, 6–20 September 1944 (P-47) (12th AF)

 Y-6 Lyon/Bron, France
 Located: 
 Now: Lyon-Bron Airport 
 Captured: September 1944 Opened: September 1944 Closed: 20 June 1945
 Repaired by MTO (12AF) Engineers
 Runway: 6000/130, CON/PSP, (17/35)
 Used by:
 79th Fighter Group, September – November 1944 (P-47) (12th AF)

 Y-7 Dôle/Tavaux, France
 Located: 
 Now: Dôle-Tavaux Airport 
 Captured: September 1944 Opened: September 1944 Closed: 17 July 1945
 Repaired by MTO (12AF) Engineers
 Runway: 5500/272, CON/PSP, (05/23)
 Used by:
 324th Fighter Group, 20 September 1944 – 4 January 1945 (P-47) (12th AF)
 371st Fighter Group, 1 October – 20 December 1944 (P-47)
 320th Bombardment Group, 1 April – 18 June 1945 (B-26)

 Y-8 Luxeuil, France
 Now:   Luxeuil Air Base (BA 116) 
 Located: 
 Opened:  22 September 1944 – 6 January 1945
 Runway:  5000x120 PSP (04/22)
 Use:  Supply and Evacuation Airfield

 Y-9 Dijon/Longvic, France
 Located: 
 Now:   Dijon Air Base (BA 102) 
 Captured September 1944 Opened: September 1944 Closed: 1 July 1945
 Repaired by MTO (12AF) Engineers
 Runway: 6000/120, CON/PSP, (01/19)
 Used by: 
 415th Night Fighter Squadron, 25 September – 30 November 1944 (P-61)
 320th Bombardment Group, 11 November 1944 – 1 April 1945 (B-26)
 17th Bombardment Group, 20 November 1944 – June 1945 (B-26) (12th AF)

 Y-11 Cannes/Mandelieu, France
 Located:  
 Opened: 2 October – 23 November 1944
 Constructed by MTO (12AF) Engineers
 Runway: 3000x150 ETH
 Use:  Transport Airfield

 Y-12 St. Raphael/Frejus, France
 Located: 
 Now: Frejus Airport   (Closed)
 Opened: 26 August 1944 Closed: 20 November 1944
 Runway: 6000x150, SOD/ETH, (08/26)
 Constructed by MTO (12AF) Engineers
 Used by:
 79th Fighter Group, 25 August – October 1944 (P-47) (12th AF)

 Y-13 Cuers/Pierrefeu, France
 Now: Cuers Pierrefeu Airport   
 Located:  
 Opened: 24 August – 20 November 1944
 Constructed by MTO (12AF) Engineers
 Runway: 5000x150 ETH (10/28)
 Use:  Emergency landing/refueling airfield

 Y-14 Marseilles/Marignane, France
 Now: Marseille Provence Airport   
 Located:  
 Opened: 12 September 1944 – October 1945
 Repaired by MTO (12AF) Engineers
 Runway: 4850x150 SOD (15/33)
 Use:  Transport Airfield
 1411th Army Air Force Base Unit, October 1944 – October 1945

 Y-15 Aix/Les Milles, France
 Now: Aix-en-Provence Aerodrome   
 Located:   
 Opened: 28 August – 20 November 1944
 Repaired by MTO (12AF) Engineers
 Runway: 4200x150 ETH
 Use:  Resupply/Casualty evacuation airfield

 Y-16 Salon, France
 Located: 
 Now:   Salon-de-Provence Air Base (BA 701)
 Opened: 28 August 1944 Closed: 20 November 1944
 Runway: 6000x150, SOD/ETH, (04/22)
 Repaired by MTO (12AF) Engineers
 Used by:
 27th Fighter Bomber Group, 30 April – 11 September 1944 (P-47) (12th AF)
 47th Bombardment Group, 7–18 September 1944 (A-20) (12th AF)

 Y-17 Istres/Le Tube, France
 Also known as: AAF-196
 Located: 
 Now:   Istres-Le Tubé Air Base (BA 125)
 Opened: 27 August 1944 Closed: Undetermined
 Repaired by MTO (12AF) Engineers
 Runway 1: 5800x197, ASP, (15/33)
 Runway 2: 6000x150, ETH, (15/33)
 Runway 3: 6000x200, ASP, (10/28)
 Used by:
 324th Fighter Group, 2–6 September 1944 (P-47) (12th AF)

 Y-18 Le Vallon, France
 Located:  (abandoned)
 Opened: 30 August 1944 Closed: 20 November 1944
 Constructed by MTO (12AF) Engineers
 Runway: 7800x300, SOD, (13/31)
 Used by: 
 415th Night Fighter Squadron, 1–25 September 1944 (P-61)
 417th Night Fighter Squadron, 12 September – 5 April 1945 (Bristol Beaufighters) (12th AF)

 Y-19 La Jasse, France
 Located: 
 Opened: 30 August – 20 November 1944
 Runway: 6000x150 SOD (12/30)
 Use:  Emergency landing/refueling airfield

 Y-20 Sisteron, France
 Located:  
 Opened: 28 August – 20 November 1944
 Constructed by MTO (12AF) Engineers
 Runway: 5000x150 SOD (17/35)
 Use: Emergency Landing/Refueling Airfield

 Y-21 Montelimar/Ancone, France
 Now: Montélimar Ancone Airport 
 Located:  
 Opened: 3 September – 20 November 1944
 Constructed by MTO (12AF) Engineers
 Runway: 6000x150 SOD (17/35)
 Use:  Emergency landing/refueling airfield

 Y-22 Crest, France
 Located:  
 Opened: 29 August – 20 November 1944 
 Constructed by MTO (12AF) Engineers
 Runway: 5000x150 SOD (01/19)
 Use: Supply and Evacuation Airfield

 Y-23 Valence, France
 Located:  
 Now: Valence-Chabeuil Airport 
 Opened: 2 September 1944 Closed: 20 November 1944
 Constructed by MTO (12AF) Engineers
 Runway: 5500x150, SOD, (01/19)
 Used by:
 79th Fighter Group, September 1944 (P-47) (12th AF)

 Y-24 Satolas, France
 Now: Lyon-Saint Exupéry Airport 
 Located:   
 Opened: 7 September – 20 November 1944 
 Runway:  4000x150 SOD (17/35)
 Use: 
 111th Tactical Reconnaissance Squadron, September 1944

 Y-25 Lyon/Loyettes, France
 Located: 
 Opened:   Closed: 20 November 1944
 Constructed by MTO (12AF) Engineers
 Runway: 6000x150, SOD, (02/20)
 Used by:
 27th Fighter Bomber Group, 11 September – October 1944 (P-47) (12th AF)

 Y-26 Lons-le-Saunier, France
 Now: Lons-le-Saunier Airport
 Located:    
 Opened:  12 September – 20 November 1944
 Runway: 3000/150 SOD (08/26)
 Use: 
 72d Liaison Squadron, September 1944

 Y-27 Besancon/Thise, France
 Now: Besancon-Thiese Airport
 Located:   
 Opened: 13 September – 20 November 1944
 Runway:  3500/150 SOD (06/27)
 Use: Supply and Evacuation Airfield

French Noncombat Support ALGs

 Y-30 Le Havre/Octeville, France
 Now: Le Havre – Octeville Airport 
 Located:  
 Opened:  2 November 1944 – 15 December 1945
 Runway 1: 3500x125 PSP (05/23)
 Runway 2: 3300x120 PSP (10/28)
 Use: Used by United States Navy (Transport Airfield)

 Y-36 Cognac, France
 Now:   BA 709 Cognac – Châteaubernard Air Base
 Located:   
 Opened:  6 December 1944 – 11 July 1945
 Runway 1: 5200x260 CON (09/27)
 Runway 2: 4200x260 CON (05/23)
 Use: Emergency Refuelling/Landing Airfield

 Y-37 Bordeaux/Mérignac, France
 Now:   BA 106 Bordeaux-Mérignac Air Base
 Located:   
 Opened:  6 December 1944 – 11 July 1945
 Runway 1: 6560x180 CON (04/22)
 Runway 2: 5412x180 CON (10/28)
 Use:  Transport Airfield/Tactical Air Depot

 Y-38 Toulouse/Blagnac, France
 Now: Toulouse-Blagnac Airport 
 Located:   
 Opened:  6 December 1944 – 11 July 1945
 Runway: 6000x125 CON (14/32)
 Use:  Transport Airfield/Tactical Air Depot

 Y-40 Strasbourg/Entzheim, France
 Now: Strasbourg Airport 
 Located: 
 Opened: 6 April – 11 November 1945 
 Runway:  5000x120 PSP (07/25)
 Use: Emergency Landing/Refueling Field

 Y-45 Condé-sur-Marne, France
 Located:  (approximately)
 Opened: 24 January – 5 November 1945 
 Runway 1: 4000x120 SOD (06/24)
 Runway 2: 4000x120 SOD (10/28)
 Use:  Transport Airfield

 Y-48 Auxerre, France
 Located:  (approximately)
 Opened:  3 February – 18 April 1945
 Runway:  3300/120 SOD
 Use:  Transport Airfield

 Y-49 Bourges, France
 Now: Bourges Airport 
 Located:  (approximately)
 Opened:  3 February – 18 April 1945 
 Runway: 3800/193 CON (06/24)
 Use:  Transport Airfield

 Y-50 Avord, France
 Now:   BA 702 Avord Air Base
 Located:  
 Opened:  3 February – 29 May 1945
 Runway 1: 5240x262 CON
 Runway 2: 5270x262 CON
 Use:  Transport Airfield

 Y-52 Nice, France
 Located: 
 Opened:  17 February – 30 May 1945
 Runway: 4500x150 ETH (05/23)
 Use: Fighter/Bomber Emergency Landing Airfield
 Now: Aéroport de Nice-Côte d'Azur

 Y-53 Colmar, France
 Now: Colmar Airport 
 Located:  
 Opened:  26 March – 11 November 1945
 Runway: 5000x120 PSP (01/19)
 Use: Fighter/Bomber Emergency Landing Airfield

 R-51 Cazaux/Bordeaux, France
 Now:    BA 120 Cazaux Air Base
 Located: 
 Opened:  21 April – 1 August 1945
 Runway:  
 Use: Transport Airfield

Benelux Liberation 

 A-78 Florennes/Juzaine, Belgium
 Located: 
 Now:    Florennes Air Base
 Captured: 11 September
 Opened: 11 September 1944 Closed: Unknown
 Runway 1: 4343x164, CON (16/34)
 Runway 2: 5509x164, CON/PSP (17/35)
 Used by: 
 422d Night Fighter Squadron, 18 September 1944 – 6 April 1945 (P-61)
 370th Fighter Group, 26 September 1944 – 27 January 1945 (P-38)
 474th Fighter Group, 1 October 1944 – 22 March 1945 (P-38)
 344th Bombardment Group, 5 April – 15 September 1945 (B-26)

 A-84 Chievres, Belgium (AAF-181)
 Located: 
 Now:   Chièvres Air Base
 Captured: 13 September Opened: 16 September 1944 Closed: 15 May 1945
 Runway 1: 5516x165, CON, (02/20)
 Runway 2: 5902x165, CON, (09/27)
 Used by:
 368th Fighter Group, 2 October – 27 December 1944 (P-47)
 365th Fighter Group, 4 October – 27 December 1944 (P-47)
 352d Fighter Group, 27 January – 14 April 1945 (P-51) (8th AF)
 361st Fighter Group, 1 February – April 1945 (P-47) (8th AF)

 A-85 Senzeilles, Belgium
 Located: 
 Opened: 9 September 1944 – 13 February 1945 
 Runway: 3600x150 SOD (12/30)
 Use:  Transport Airfield

 A-86 Vitrival, Belgium
 Located: 
 Opened:  11 September 1944 – 13 February 1945
 Runway:  3600x150 SOD (04/22)
 Use:  Transport Airfield

 A-87 Charleroi, Belgium (AAF-184)
 Located: 
 Now: Brussels South Charleroi Airport 
 Opened: 14 September 1944 Closed: 10 August 1945
 Runway: 3600x100, PSP, (06/24)
 Used by:
 67th Tactical Reconnaissance Group, September 1944 – March 1945 (P-38/F-4; P-51/F-5)

 A-89 Le Culot, Belgium
 Also known as: B-68 (Royal Air Force)
 Located: 
 Now:  Beauvechain Air Base 
 Captured: Opened: 28 October 1944 Closed: Undetermined
 Runway 1: 5793x165, TAR/PSP, (04/22)
 Runway 2: 4955x165, TAR, (12/30) 
 Used by:
 373d Fighter Group, 22 October 1944 – 11 March 1945 (P-47)
 36th Fighter Group, 27 October 1944 – 26 March 1945 (P-47)
 322d Bombardment Group, March–June 1946 (B-26)

 A-92 Sint-Truiden (Saint Trond), Belgium
 Also known as: B-62 (Royal Air Force)
 Located: 
 Now:   Sint-Truiden Air Base
 Captured 16 September 1944
 Opened: 18 September 1944 Closed: Undetermined
 Runway 1: 5250x165, CON (14/32)
 Runway 2: 4740x165, CON (09/27)
 Runway 3: 5070x165, CON (06/24)
 Used by:
 48th Fighter Group, 30 September 1944 – 26 March 1945 (A-20)
 404th Fighter Group, 4 October 1944 – 30 March 1945 (P-37)
 386th Bombardment Group, 9 April – 27 July 1945 (B-26)

 A-93 Liege/Bierset, Belgium
 Located:  
 Opened: 17 November 1944 – 8 August 1945  
 Runway: 4000x120 PSP (08/26)
 Use: Detachment, 153d Liaison Squadron

 A-97 Sandweiler, Luxembourg
 Located:  
 Now: Luxembourg - Findel Airport 
 Opened: 18 September 1944 Closed: 15 August 1945
 Runway: 3400x132, SOD, (06/24)
 Used by:
 363d Tactical Reconnaissance Group, 4–29 October 1944 (P-38/F-4; P-51/F-5)

 Y-10 Le Culot/East, Belgium
 Located: 
 Now:    Goetsenhoven Military Airfield 
 Captured: September 1944 Opened: September 1944 Closed: 25 June 1945
 Runway: 3600/120, PSP, (04/22)
 Used by:
 371st Fighter Group, 1 October – 20 December 1944

 Y-29 Asch, Belgium
 Located:  
 Now:   Zutendaal Air Base
 Opened: 20 November 1944 Closed: 20 June 1945
 Runway: 5000x150, SOD, (06/24)
 Used by:
 366th Fighter Group, 19 November 1944 – 11 April 1945 (P-47)
 406th Fighter Group, 8 February – 15 April 1945 (P-47)
 391st Bombardment Group, 16 April – 27 May 1945 (B-26)

 Y-32 Ophoven, Belgium
 Located:  (abandoned)
 Opened: 10 December 1944 Closed: 29 May 1945
 Runway: 5000x150, PSP, (12/30)
 Used by:
 370th Fighter Group, 27 January – 20 April 1945 (P-47)
 405th Fighter Group, 30 February – April 1945 (P-47)

 Y-41 Virton, Belgium
 Located:  (approximately)
 Opened: 26 December 1944 – 3 May 1945 
 Runway:  3000x80 CINDER (10/28)
 Use: Liaison and emergency landing airfield

 Y-44 Maastricht, Netherlands
 Located: 
 Now: Maastricht Aachen Airport 
 Opened: 23 March 1945 Closed: 1 August 1945
 Runway: 5565x120, PSP, (04/22)
 Used by:
 387th Bombardment Group, 29 April – 24 May 1945 (B-26)

 Y-47 Namur, Belgium
 Located:  (approximately)
 Opened: 22 February – 30 November 1945 
 Runway: 3450/90 PSP/SMT (07/25)
 Use: 
 9th Bombardment Division,  – 20 April November 1945
 99th Bombardment Wing, 1 July – August 1945
 98th Bombardment Wing, October – November 1945
 112th Liaison Squadron, 26 October 1944 – 11 February 1945
 Transferred to Royal Air Force control, 30 November 1945

 Y-55 Venlo, Netherlands
 Located: 
 Fliegerhorst Venlo-Herongen astride the Dutch-German border. Now: German Bundeswehr Depot Herongen, before: US-Army POMCUS Depot Herongen supporting NORTHAG (Germany)
 Opened: 12 March 1945 Closed: 14 August 1945
 Runway 1: 4200x300, BRK, (08/26)
 Runway 2: 5500x300, PSP/BRK, (12/30)
 Used by:
 363d Tactical Reconnaissance Group, 15 March – April 1945 (P-38/F-4; P-51/F-5)
 373d Fighter Group, 11 March – 20 April 1945 (P-47)
 397th Bombardment Group, 25 April – 24 May 1945 (B-26)
 394th Bombardment Group, 2 May – September 1945 (B-26)

Western Allied invasion of Germany
Airfields captured or established to support combat operations during the Western Allied Invasion of Germany (1 February – 8 May 1945). This section lists those used during the war; ones used during the occupation period of Germany are listed in the Army of Occupation ALGs section.

Rhineland Campaign

 Y-43 Duren, Germany
 Construction cancelled

 Y-46 Aachen, Germany
 Located: 
 Now: Merzbruck Airport 
 Opened: 14 March 1945 Closed: 11 May 1945
 Runway: 5000x120, PSP, (05/23)
 Used by:
 365th Fighter Group, 16 March – 13 April 1945 (P-47)
 36th Fighter Group, 26 March – 8 April 1945 (P-47)

 Y-51 Vogelsang, Germany
 Located:  (abandoned)
 Opened: 23 March 1945 Closed: 10 July 1945
 Runway: 3600x120, PSP/PAP, (15/33)
 Used by:
 67th Tactical Reconnaissance Group, 2 March – April 1945 (P-38/F-4; P-51/F-5)

 Y-54 Kelz, Germany
 Located:  (abandoned)
 Opened: 24 March 1945 Closed: 11 July 1945
 Runway: 5000x120, PSP, (09/27)
 Used by:
 48th Fighter Group, 26 March – 17 April 1945 (P-47)
 404th Fighter Group, 30 March – 12 April 1945 (P-47)

 Y-56 Moenchen Gladbach, Germany
 Now: Park, industrial area (Mönchengladbach)
 Located:  
 Opened:  30 March– 30 September 1945
 Runway: 3600x120 PSP (07/25)
 Use: 
 125th Liaison Squadron, March – April 1945
 Closed: 30 September 1945, turned over to Royal Air Force as part of British Zone of Occupation.

 Y-58 Cologne, Germany
 Now: unknown
 Located: unknown
 Opened:  8 March – 18 June 1945 
 Runway: 3000x100 SOD (01/19)
 Use: Resupply and Evacuation Airfield

 Y-59 Strassfeld, Germany
 Located:   (abandoned)
 Opened: 29 March 1945 Closed: 17 May 1945
 Runway: 5000x120, PSP/CON, (07/25)
 Used by:
 474th Fighter Group, 22 March – 22 April 1945 (P-38)
 414th Night Fighter Squadron (DET), 3–23 April 1945 (P-61) (12th AF)
 422d Night Fighter Squadron, 6–24 April 1945 (P-61)

 Y-60 Dunstekoven, Germany
 Located:  (approximately)
 Opened: 12 March – 11 May 1945
 Runway:  3150x120 SOD (02/20)
 Use: Supply and Evacuation Airfield

 Y-61 Krefeld,, Germany
 Located: 
 Opened: 28 March – 15 June 1945
 Runway: 3600x120 PSP, (14/32)
 Use: Fighter/Bomber Airfield; Tactical Air Depot

 Y-62 Mendig (Niedermendig), Germany
 Located: 
 Now: Mendig airfield 
 Opened: 17 March 1945 Closed: 11 May 1945
 Runway: 5000x120, PSP/CON, (07/25)
 Used by:
 36th Fighter Group, 26 March – 8 April 1945 (P-47)

 Y-63 Koblenz, Germany
 Located:  
 Now: built-up area
 Opened: 30 March – 11 May 1945
 Runway: 3000x120 SOD (07/25)
 Use: Supply and Evacuation/ Emergency Landing Airfield

 Y-64 Ober-Olm, Germany
 Located: 
 Now: Mainz Finthen Airport  
 Opened: 27 March 1945 Closed: 20 June 1945
 Runway 1: 4000x120, SOD, (07/25)
 Runway 2: 5000x120, SMT, (08/26)
 Used by:
 10th Reconnaissance Group, 4 March – April 1945 (P-38/F-4; P-51/F-5)
 354th Fighter Group, 8–30 April 1945 (P-47)

 Y-65 Chantilly, France
 Located: 
 Opened: 22 December 1944 – 8 August 1945
 Runway 1: 2200x150 SOD (07/25)
 Runway 2: 2150x150 SOD (00/18)
 Use: Liaison Airfield

 Y-66 Gollheim, Germany
 Located:  
 Opened: 25 March – 30 April 1945
 Runway: 3600x120 SOD (06/24)
 Use: Supply and Evacuation Airfield

 Y-70 Maitzborn, Germany
 Located:   
 Opened: 30 March – 30 April 1945
 Runway: 3600x120 SOD
 Use: Supply and Evacuation Airfield

Central Europe Campaign

 Y-67 Gelnhausen, Germany
 Now: Agricultural, housing and industrial area
 Located:  
 Opened: 1–30 April 1945
 Runway: 3600x120 SOD (10/28)
 Use: Supply and Evacuation Airfield

 Y-68 Lachen/Speyerdorf, Germany
 Construction Cancelled

 Y-69 Mittelbrunn, Germany
 Located:  (approximately)
 Opened: 26 March – 3 May 1945
 Runway: 2000x150 SOD (03/21)
 Use: Liaison Airfield

 Y-71 Eudenbach, Germany
 Now: Glider airfield Eudenbach 
 Located: 
 Opened: 26 March – 30 April 1945
 Runway: 3400x130 SOD (06/24)
 Use: Supply and Evacuation Airfield

 Y-72 Braunshardt, Germany
 Located: 
 Captured: March 1945; Opened: 27 March 1945
 Runway: 5571/150, Soil, Cement & PSP, (07/25)
 Used by: 
 415th Night Fighter Squadron, 17 April – 2 October 1945 (P-61)
 86th Fighter Group, 17 April – 26 September 1945 (P-47) (12th AF)
 417th Night Fighter Squadron, 26 June – 8 August 1945 (P-61)
 Closed: 30 October 1945, Now: agricultural use

 Y-74 Frankfurt/Eschborn, Germany
 Located:  (abandoned)
 Opened: 31 March 1945 Closed: July 1945
 Runway: 5200/120, PSP, (12/30)
 Used by:
 371st Fighter Group, 7 April – 5 May 1945 (P-47)
 367th Fighter Group, 20 April – July 1945 (P-47)
 US Army, July 1945 – 1992

 Y-75 Frankfurt/Rebstock, Germany
 Located:   (approximately)
 Opened: 15 April – 30 May 1945
 Runway: 3600x120 SOD (08/26)
 Use: Liaison Airfield

 Y-77 Babenhausen, Germany
 Now: Former Flugplatz Babenhausen, closed 2019
 Located: 
 Opened: 31 March – 30 April 1945
 Runway: 3600x120 SOD (02/20)
 Use: Supply and Evacuation Airfield

 Y-78 Biblis, Germany
 Located:  (abandoned)
 Opened: 2 April 1945 Closed: July 1945
 Runway: 5000/120, SOD/SMT, (11/29)
 Used by:
 27th Fighter Bomber Group, 24 April – June 1945 (A-36) (12th AF)

 Y-79 Mannheim/Sandhofen, Germany
 Now:  Coleman Army Airfield 
 Located: 
 Opened: 4 April 1945
 Runway 1: 5200/120, PSP, (05/23)
 Runway 2: 5200/120, SMT, (05/23)
 Used by:
 358th Fighter Group, 2 April – 23 June 1945 (P-47)

 Y-81 Ailertchen, Germany
 Now: Flugplatz Ailertchen
 Located:  
 Opened: 30 March – 30 April 1945
 Runway: 3700x120 SOD (05/23)
 Use: Supply and Evacuation Airfield

 Y-82 Kirchhellen, Germany
 Was: Fliegerhorst Kirchhellen
 Now: Flugplatz Schwarze Heide 
 Located:  
 Opened: 30 March – 5 July 1945
 Runway 1: 3600x120 SOD (05/23)
 Runway 2: 3600x120 SOD (05/23)
 Use: Supply and Evacuation Airfield

 Y-83 Limburg (Limburg an der Lahn), Germany
 Located:  (abandoned)
 Opened: 3 April 1945 Closed: June 1945
 Runway: 3600/120, SOD, (08/26)
 Used by:
 67th Tactical Reconnaissance Group, 2–10 April 1945 (P-38/F-4; P-51/F-5)

 Y-85 Ettinghausen, Germany
 Located:  (approximately)
 Opened: 31 March 1945 – 30 April 1945
 Runway: 3450x120 SOD (04/22)
 Use:  Supply and Evacuation Airfield

 Y-87 Nidda, Germany
 Now: Agricultural, housing and industrial area
 Located: 
 Opened: 1 April – 15 May 1945
 Runway: 3600x120 SOD (14/32)
 Use:  Supply and Evacuation Airfield

 Y-88 Wertheim am Main, Germany
 Later: Wertheim AAF
 Now: Industrial & housing area
 Located: 
 Opened: 2 April – 15 May 1945
 Runway: 3800x120 SOD (05/23)
 Use:  Supply and Evacuation Airfield

 Y-89 Mannheim/Stadt, Germany
 Now: Mannheim City Airport 
 Located: 
 Opened: 10 April – 8 August 1945
 Runway 1: 2950x120 SOD (14/32)
 Runway 2: 2850x120 SOD (05/23)
 Use:  Liaison Airfield

 Y-92 Dörnberg, Germany
 Now: Glider airfield 
 Located: 
 Opened:  2–30 April 1945
 Runway: 3000x120 SOD (09/27)
 Use: Supply and Evacuation Airfield

 Y-93 Munster, Germany
 Construction cancelled

 Y-94 Munster/Handorf, Germany
 Located:  (abandoned)
 Opened: 12 April 1945 Closed: June 1945
 Runway: 5019/120, TAR, (08/26)
 Used by:
 366th Fighter Group, 11 April – 25 June 1945 (P-47)
 406th Fighter Group, 15 April – 5 June 1945 (P-47)

 Y-95 Bracht, Germany
 Located: 
 Opened:  5–30 April 1945
 Runway: 3400x120 SOD (00/18)
 Use: Supply and Evacuation Airfield

 Y-97 Paderborn, Germany
 Located:  (approximately)
 Opened:  7 April – 2 June 1945
 Runway: 3600x120 SOD (06/24)
 Use: Supply and Evacuation Airfield

 Y-98 Lippstadt, Germany
 Located: 
 Captured: 7 April 1945 Closed: 12 July 1945
 Runway: 4750/120, SMT/PSP, (08/26)
 Used by:
 373d Fighter Group, 20 April – 20 May 1945 (P-47)

 Y-99 Gütersloh, Germany
 Now:  Princess Royal Barracks (British Army)  
 Located: 
 Captured: 4 April 1945 Opened: 6 April 1945 Closed: 22 June 1945
 Runway: 4040/120, SMT, (08/26)
 Used by:
 363d Tactical Reconnaissance Group, 15–22 April 1945 (P-38/F-4; P-51/F-5)
 370th Fighter Group, 20 April – 27 June 1945 (P-38)

 R-1 Wenigenlupnitz, Germany
 Now: Eisenach-Kindel Airport
 Located:  
 Opened:  8–30 April 1945
 Runway: 3400x120 SOD (10/28)
 Use: Supply and Evacuation airfield

 R-2 Langensalza, Germany
 Now: Bad Langensalza Airport 
 Located:  
 Captured 8 April 1945 : Opened: 8 April 1945 Closed: 5 July 1945
 Runway: 4921/120, SOD/TAR, (08/26)
 Used by:
 474th Fighter Group, 22 April – 16 June 1945 (P-38)
 422d Night Fighter Squadron, 24 April – 25 May 1945 (P-61)

 R-3 Röhrensee, Germany
 Later: Röhrensee Kaserne
 Located:   
 Opened:  12–30 April 1945
 Runway:  3600x120 SOD (11/29)
 Use: Supply and Evacuation airfield 
 Transferred to United States Army

 R-4 Gotha/North, Germany
 Located:    
 Opened: 11 April – 5 May 1945 
 Runway:  3600x120 SOD/CON (10/28)
 Use: Supply and Evacuation airfield

 R-5 Crailsheim, Germany
 Located:    
 Opened:  24 April – 30 May 1945
 Runway: 3600x120 SOD (08/26)
 Use: Supply and Evacuation airfield

 R-7 Weimar, Germany
 Located:   
 Opened: 14 April – 30 June 1945
 Runway: 3300x120 SOD (09/27)
 Use:
 IX Fighter Command, April – July 1945
 IX Tactical Air Command, 26 April – 26 June 1945
 125th Liaison Squadron, 9 March – 4 April 1945
 Closed 30 June 1945, turned over to Soviet Union as part of Soviet Zone of Occupation.

 R-8 Eisfeld, Germany
 Located:   
 Opened: 13–30 April 1045 
 Runway: 3000x120 SOD (06/24)
 Use: Supply and Evacuation airfield

 R-9 Erfurt/Bindersleben, Germany
 Now: Erfurt-Weimar Airport 
 Located:   
 Opened: 14–30 April 1945 
 Runway: 4300/120 SOD/CON (09/27)
 Use: 15th Tactical Reconnaissance Squadron, April 1945

 R-11 Eschwege, Germany
 Located:   (abandoned)
 Captured 6 April 1945 Opened: 7 April 1945 Closed: Undetermined
 Runway: 3500/120, SOD, (12/30)
 Used by:
 67th Tactical Reconnaissance Group, 10 April – July 1945

 R-12 Kassel/Rothwesten, Germany
 Located:   (abandoned)
 Opened: 7 April 1945 Closed: Undetermined
 Runway: 5000/120, PSP, (13/31)
 Used by:
 48th Fighter Group, 17–29 April 1945
 36th Fighter Group, 21 April – 15 November 1945

 R-13 Hessich/Lichtenau, Germany
 Now Flugplatz Hessisch-Lichtenau 
 Located:   
 Opened: 8 April – 22 June 1945 
 Runway: 3600x120 SOD (09/27)
 Use: Supply and Evacuation airfield, Storage field

 R-15 Oschersleben, Germany
 Now: Flugplatz Oschersleben
 Located:  
 Opened:  12 April – 1 October 1945
 Runway: 3100x150 CON (10/28)
 Use: Supply and Evacuation airfield

 R-16 Hildesheim, Germany
 Now: Flugplatz Hildesheim-Drispenstedt
 Located:    
 Opened: 12 April – 5 June 1945 
 Runway: 5000x120 SOD (08/26)
 Use: Supply and Evacuation airfield

 R-17 Göttingen, Germany
 Was: Flughaven Göttinger (closed 1945)
 Located:  
 Opened:  14 April – 12 July 1945  
 Runway: 3600x120 SOD
 Use: Supply and Evacuation airfield

 R-18 Kölleda, Germany
 Now: Flugplatz Sömmerda-Dermsdorf
 Located:   
 Opened: 14–30 April 1945  
 Runway: 3600x120 SOD (07/25)
 Use: Supply and Evacuation airfield 
 
 R-19 Nordhausen, Germany
 Now: Flugplatz Nordhausen
 Located:    
 Opened:  14–30 April 1945
 Runway:  3600x120 SOD
 Use: Supply and Evacuation airfield

 R-20 Esperstedt, Germany
 Located: 
 Opened: 4–30 April 1945
 Runway:  3600x120 SOD
 Use: Supply and Evacuation airfield

 R-21 Rochau, Germany
 Located:  (approximately)
 Opened: 15 April – 15 May 1945
 Runway:  3600x120 SOD (07/25)
 Use: Supply and Evacuation airfield

 R-22 Rodigen, Germany
 Located:  (approximately)
 Opened: 16 April – 16 June 1945
 Runway:  2300x120 SOD (06/24)
 Use: Supply and Evacuation airfield

 R-23 Leipzig–Altenburg Airport, Germany
 Now: Altenburg-Nobitz Airport
 Located: 
 Opened: 16 April – 7 July 1945
 Runway: 4200x120 SOD (01/19)
 Use: Supply and Evacuation airfield

 R-27 Sachsenheim, Germany
 Located: 
 Opened: 24 April – 30 May 1945
 Runway: 4500x120 MACADM (09/27)
 Use: Emergency fighter/bomber airfield

 R-28 Fürth-Atzenhof, Germany
 Located:  (abandoned)
 Opened: 19 April 1945 Closed: Undetermined
 Runway: 4500/120, PSP, (09/27)
 Used by:
 10th Reconnaissance Group,
 362d Fighter Group, 30 April – 3 May 1945

 R-30 Fürth/Industriehafen, Germany
 Located: 
 Opened:  22 April – 30 August 1945
 Runway:  5000x172 PSP/CON (11/29)
 Use: 
 362d Fighter Group, 30 April – 3 May 1945
 425th Night Fighter Squadron, 2 May – 5 July 1945
 371st Fighter Group, 5 May – 16 August 1945

 R-31 Merseburg, Germany
 Now: Merseburg Airfield
 Located: 
 Opened: 16 April – 5 May 1945 
 Runway: 3369x170 SOD (06/24)
 Use: Supply and Evacuation Airfield

 R-32 Köthen, Germany
 Now: Köthen Airfield
 Located: 
 Opened: 18 April – 5 May 1945  
 Runway: 3300x120 SOD (07/25)
 Use: Supply and Evacuation Airfield

 R-33 Gardelegen, Germany
 Now: Industrial area
 Located:  
 Opened:  15 April – 15 June 1945 
 Runway: 3600x120 SOD (09/27)
 Use: Supply and Evacuation Airfield

 R-34 Stendal, Germany
 Now: Stendal-Borstel Airfield (ICAO: EDOV)
 Located:  
 Opened:  17 April – 15 June 1945 
 Runway: 4300x120 SOD (08/26)
 Use: Supply and Evacuation Airfield

 R-35 Völkenrode, Germany
 Now: Physikalisch-Technische Bundesanstalt (Federal research agency)
 Located:  
 Opened:  18 April – 15 May 1945 
 Runway: 3600x120 SOD (12/30)
 Use: 
 125th Liaison Squadron, April 1945

 R-36 Wesendorf, Germany
 Was: Wesendorf Airfield (Closed 2006)
 Now: Industrial area (partially)
 Located:  
 Opened:  13 April – 5 June 1945 
 Runway: 3600x120 SOD (12/30)
 Use: Supply and Evacuation Airfield

 R-37 Brunswick/Waggum, Germany
 Now: Braunschweig Airport 
 Located: 
 Captured: 20 April 1945 Opened: 22 April 1945 Closed: Undetermined
 Runway: 3600/120, SOD, (08/26)
 Used by:
 363d Tactical Reconnaissance Group, 22 April – May 1945

 R-38 Brunswick/Broitzem, Germany 
 Headquarters: 84th Fighter Wing, 22 April – 12 August 1945
 153d Liaison Squadron, 20 May – 4 June 1945 
 Closed: 31 August 1945, turned over to Royal Air Force as part of British Zone of Occupation.

 R-39 Helmstedt, Germany
 Located:  (approximately)
 Opened: 24 April – 5 July 1945
 Runway:  3600x120 SOD (04/22)
 Use: Supply and Evacuation Airfield

 R-41 Schwäbisch Hall, Germany
 Now: Flugplatz Schwäbisch Hall-Hessental
 Located:  
 Opened:  22 April – 31 August 1945
 Runway:  3600x120 CON 08/26  
 Use: Supply and Evacuation Airfield

 R-43 Nuremberg, Germany
 Now: Recreational park, fair and exhibition area 
 Located:   
 Opened:  24 April – 31 August 1945
 Runway: 3600x120 SOD 10/28  
 Use: Supply and Evacuation Airfield

 R-44 Göppingen, Germany
 Later: Göppingen AAF until 1992
 Now: Industrial area Stauferpark
 Located:   
 Opened:  25 April – 15 June 1945
 Runway: 3000x120 SOD 06/24  
 Use: Supply and Evacuation Airfield

 R-46 Roth, Germany
 Now:   Roth Air Base
 Located:   
 Opened: 25 April – 31 August 1945 
 Runway: 5200x120 PSP 09/27  
 Use: Supply and Evacuation Airfield

 R-47 Oettingen, Germany
 Located:   
 Opened:  26 April – 15 May 1945
 Runway:  3115x267 MACADAM 05/23  
 Use: Supply and Evacuation Airfield

 R-48 Ingolstadt, Germany
 Now: Ingolstadt Manching Airport
 Located:   
 Opened: 29 April – 15 May 1945 
 Runway: 3300x120 SOD 09/27  
 Use: Supply and Evacuation Airfield

 R-49 Hailfingen, Germany
 Located:  
 Opened:  30 April – 11 July 1945
 Runway 1: 4000x120 SOD 07/25  
 Runway 2: 3600x120 SOD 07/25  
 Use: Fighter/Bomber Airfield

 R-52 Leipzig/Mockau, Germany
 Later: Flughafen Leipzig-Mockau until 1991
 Now: Industrial area
 Located:  
 Opened:  27 April – 15 June 1945
 Runway:  3600x120 SOD 
 Use: Supply and Evacuation Airfield

 R-53 Zwickau, Germany
 Now: Zwickau airfield (ICAO: EDBI)
 Located: 
 Opened:  4 May – 15 June 1945
 Runway:  2870x120 SOD (07/25) 
 Use:  Supply and Evacuation Airfield

 R-55 Salzwedel, Germany
 Located: 
 Opened:  3 May – 5 July 1945
 Runway:  3600x120 SOD (08/26) 
 Use:  Supply and Evacuation Airfield

 R-58 Friedrichshafen, Germany
 Now Friedrichshafen Airport (ICAO: EDNY, IATA: FDH)
 Located: 
 Opened: 4 May – 1 August 1945
 Runway:  2700x120 SOD 
 Use:  Supply and Evacuation Airfield

 R-59 Leipheim, Germany
 Construction cancelled

 R-60 Neuburg
 Construction cancelled

 R-61 Eutingen
 Now: Eutingen airfield (ICAO: EDTE)
 Located:  
 Opened:  27 April – 1 August 1945
 Runway:  3200x240 TAR (06/24)  
 Use:  Supply and Evacuation Airfield

 R-62 Mengen
 Now: Mengen-Hohentengen Airfield (ICAO: EDTM)
 Located:   
 Opened:  25 April – 1 August 1945
 Runway: 3600x120 SOD (06/24)  
 Use: Supply and Evacuation Airfield

 R-63 Weiden
 Located:   
 Opened:  25 April – 15 June 1945
 Runway: 3150x120 SOD (07/25)  
 Use: Supply and Evacuation Airfield

 R-64 Cham
 Now: Cham-Janahof glider airfield
 Located: 
 Opened:  27 April – 15 June 1945
 Runway:  3150x120 SOD (10/28)  
 Use:  Supply and Evacuation Airfield

 R-65 Risstissen
 Located:  
 Opened: 27 April – 15 June 1945 
 Runway: 3000x120 SOD (07/25)  
 Use:  Supply and Evacuation Airfield

 R-66 Regensburg/Prufening
 Located:   (approximately)
 Opened:  28 April – 15 June 1945
 Runway: 3200x120 SOD (07/25)  
 Use: 
 14th Liaison Squadron (May 1945)

 R-69 Landau
 Now: Landau Ebenberg Airport 
 Located:   
 Opened: 1 May – 15 June 1945
 Runway: 3600x120 SOD (07/25)  
 Use:  Supply and Evacuation Airfield

 R-73 Ergolding, Germany
 Located:    (approximately)
 Opened: 3 May – 15 June 1945
 Runway:  3200x120 SOD (04/22)  
 Use: Supply & Evacuation Airfield

 R-75 Schleissheim Germany
 Now: Flugplatz Schleißheim
 Located:  
 Opened: 2 May 1945  –  31 August 1945
 Runway: 5500x162 CON/PSP (07/25)  
 Use: Supply & Evacuation/Fighter Bomber Airfield

 R-76 Pocking, Germany
 Now: Photovoltaic power plant
 Located:  
 Opened: 3 May 1945
 Runway:  3600x120 SOD (06/24)
 Use:  Supply & Evacuation Airfield

 R-79 Schongau, Germany
 Located:   (approximately)
 Opened: 3 May – 8 August 1945
 Runway:  3000x120 SOD (07/25)  
 Use:  Supply & Evacuation Airfield

 R-80 Salzburg, Austria
 Now: Salzburg Airport
 Located: 
 Opened:  7 May 1945
 Runway: 4000x120 CON (10/28)  
 Use:  Supply and Evacuation airfield

 R-83 Mühldorf, Germany
 Located: 
 Opened:  4 May – 15 June 1945
 Runway: 3200x120 SOD (12/30)  
 Use: Supply and Evacuation airfield

 R-84 Augsburg, Germany
 Now: Augsburg Airport
 Located: 
 Opened:  3 May 1945
 Runway: 3000x120 SOD (10/28)  
 Use:
 72d Liaison Squadron (May–June 1945)

 R-86 Bad Aibling, Germany
 Located:  (approximately)
 Opened: 4 May 1945 
 Runway: 3000x150 SOD (11/29)  
 Use: Supply and Evacuation airfield

 R-88 Innsbruck, Austria
 Now: Innsbruck Airport
 Located: 
 Opened: 5 May – 12 July 1945 
 Runway: 3000x120 SOD (08/26)  
 Use:  Supply and Evacuation airfield

 R-89 Plzeň, Czechoslovakia
 Now: Plzeň Airport
 Located: 
 Opened: 8 May – 5 September 1945 
 Runway: 4000x260 SOD/CON (09/27)  
 Use:  Supply and Evacuation airfield

 R-90 Wels, Austria
 Now: Wels Airport
 Located: 
 Opened:  7 May – 5 July 1945
 Runway:  3600x120 SOD (08/26)  
 Use:  Supply and Evacuation airfield

 R-93 Holzkirchen/Marschall, Germany
 Located:  (approximately)
 Opened: 5 June 1945 
 Runway 1: 3625x120 SOD (08/26)  
 Runway 2: 3600x120 SOD (03/21)  
 Use: Military Storage Airfield

 R-94 Nellingen, Germany
 Now: Segelfluggelände Oppingen-Au
 Located: 
 Opened:  1 August 1945
 Runway:  3500x225 SOD (14/32)  
 Use:  Military Storage Airfield

 R-97 Regensburg/Obertraubling, Germany
 Construction cancelled

Army of Occupation ALGs 

ALGs used by American forces in Occupied Germany and Austria after the German surrender on 7 May 1945. Primarily used for storage of captured German weapons, aircraft and equipment before their destruction. Also for garrisons of US Army or US Army Air Force personnel.

 Y-57 Trier, Germany
 Later AAF Station Trier; Trier Air Base  
 Now: industrial area
 Located:  
 Opened: 10 March 1945 
 Runway: 3625x120, CON/PSP, (06/24)
 Used by:
 10th Reconnaissance Group,  – 4 March April 1945 (P-38/F-4; P-51/F-5)

 Y-73 Frankfurt/Rhein-Main, Germany
 Later: AAF Station Frankfurt; Rhein-Main Air Base
 Now: Frankfurt Airport 
 Located: 
 Captured: 30 March 1945 Opened: 10 April 1945
 Runway: 6000/120, CON, (07/25)
 Used by:
 362d Fighter Group, 8–30 April 1945 (P-47)
 425th Night Fighter Squadron, 12 April – 2 May 1945 (P-61)
 368th Fighter Group, 15 April – 13 May 1945 (P-47)
 Closed 10 October 2005

 Y-76 Darmstadt/Griesheim, Germany
 Later: AAF Station Darmstadt/Griesheim
 Transferred to United States Army, December 1945 (Darmstadt Army Airfield)
 Now: Griesheim Airfield 
 Located:  
 Opened: 31 March 1945
 Runway: 3600x120 SOD (08/26)
 Use: 
 72d Liaison Squadron, 1–15 April; June–July 1945
 167th Liaison Squadron, 10 June – 2 July 1945
 63d Fighter Wing, 17 July – 1 December 1945
 64th Fighter Wing, 7 July – 1 December 1945
 71st Fighter Wing, 25 September – November 1945
 155th Photographic Reconnaissance Squadron, 28 September – 24 November 1945
 160th Photographic Reconnaissance Squadron, 22 September – 24 November 1945

 Y-80 Wiesbaden, Germany
 Later: AAF Station Wiesbaden; Wiesbaden Army Airfield
 Transferred to United States Army, 31 December 1975 (Project Creek Swap)
 Now:  Wiesbaden Army Airfield
 Located: 
 Captured 3 April 1945
 47th Liaison Squadron, 2 May 1945 – 24 June 1946
 United States Air Forces in Europe, 26 September 1945 – 15 August 1953
 Twelfth Air Force, 1 January 1951 – 27 April 1953
 51st Troop Carrier Wing, September 1945 – 5 January 1948
 2d Air Division, 1–10 June 1949
 3d Air Division, 25 October 1953 – 1 March 1954
 322d Troop Carrier Wing, 1–22 March 1954
 363d Reconnaissance Group, May–August 1945
 60th Troop Carrier Group*, 15 December 1948 – 26 September 1949
 317th Troop Carrier Group*, 30 September – 15 December 1948
* Assigned to 1st Airlift Task Force (Berlin Airlift)

 Y-84 Giessen, Germany
 Later: AAF Station Giessen
 Transferred to United States Army control Giessen Army Depot (Closed 2008)
 Located:  (approximately)
 Opened: 30 March – 5 June 1945
 Runway: 3300x120 SOD (09/27)
 Use: Supply and Evacuation Airfield

 Y-86 Fritzlar, Germany
 Later: AAF Station Fritzlar 
 Turned over to United States Army (Fritzlar Kaserne), 14 September 1947
 Now:  Fritzlar Air Base 
 Located: 
 Opened: 31 March 1945
 Runway: 5000/120, PSP, (12/30)
 Used by:
 404th Fighter Group, 12 April – 23 June 1945 (P-47)
 365th Fighter Group, 13 April – 29 July 1945 (P-47)

 Y-90 Giebelstadt, Germany
 Later: AAF Station Giebelstadt 9 May 1945
 Later: Giebelstadt Army Airfield
 Now: Giebelstadt Airfield 
 Transferred to United States Army Control, 1 August 1968
 Located: 
 Captured: 3 April 1945 Opened: 5 April 1945
 Runway: 6000/120, CON, (08/26)
 Used by:
 50th Fighter Group, 20 April – 21 May 1945 (P-47)
 417th Night Fighter Squadron, 24 April – 21 May 1945 (P-61)
 Closed 23 June 2006

 Y-91 Hanau/Langendiebach, Germany
 Transferred to United States Army control
 Later: Fliegerhorst Kaserne/Hanau Army Airfield
 Now: closed; to be developed
 Located: 
 Opened:  6 April – 31 August 1946
 Runway: 4000x120 PSP (10/28)
 Use: Supply and Evacuation Airfield; Tactical Air Depot

 Y-96 Kassel/Waldau, Germany
 Transferred to United States Army control
 Later: Waldau Kaserne (Waldau Army Airfield/Waldau Kaserne)
 Located: 
 Opened:  5 April – 31 October 1945
 Runway: 4000x120 CON (01/19)
 Use: Supply and Evacuation Airfield; Tactical Air Depot

 R-6 Kitzingen, Germany
 Later: AAF Station Kitzingen
 Transferred to United States Army control
 Was: Kitzingen Army Airfield (Harvey Barracks) (Closed)
 Now: Kitzingen Airport 
 Located:  
 Captured: 11 April 1945 Opened: 15 April 1945
 Runway: 5500/120, ASP/CON, (04/22)
 Used by:
 405th Fighter Group, 30 April – 8 May 1945

 R-10 Illesheim, Germany
 Later: AAF Station Illesheim
 Transferred to United States Army control
 Now:  Storck Barracks United States Army
 Located: 
 Captured 16 April 1945 Opened: 17 April 1945
 Runway: 4500/120, PAP, (06/24)
 Used by:
 48th Fighter Group, 29 April – 5 July 1945
 362d Fighter Group, 3–12 May 1945

 R-14 Detmold, Germany
 Later: AAF Station Detmold
 Transferred to British Royal Army control
 Later: BAOR/Army Air Corps Hobart Barracks (Closed 1995)
 Now: Flugplatz Detmold
 Located:   
 Opened:  11 April – 22 June 1945
 Runway:  3300x120 SOD (09/27)
 Use: Supply and Evacuation airfield, Tactical Air Depot

 R-24 Würzburg, Germany
 Transferred to United States Army control
 Later Leighton Army Airfield (Heliport)
 Located: 
 Opened: 17 April – 15 May 1945
 Runway: 3000x120 SOD (12/30)
 Use: Supply and Evacuation airfield
 Transferred to United States Army

  R-25 Schweinfurt, Germany
 Later: AAF Station Schweinfurt; Schweinfurt Air Base
 Transferred to United States Army control
 Now:  Schweinfurt Army Heliport 
 Located: 
 Captured 18 April 1945, Wartime use: S&E Field
 474th Fighter Group, 16 June – 25 October 1945
 86th Fighter Group, 23 October 1945 – 15 February 1946
 355th Fighter Group, 15 April – 1 August 1946
 52d Fighter Group, 9 November 1946 – 5 May 1947
 507th Air Materiel Squadron, 1 June – 31 September 1947 (Air Technical Service Command)

 R-26 Bayreuth/Bindlach, Germany
 Later: AAF Station Bayreuth/Bindlach
 Transferred to United States Army control
 Now: Bindlacher Berg Airport 
 Located: 
 Captured 18 April 1945, Wartime use: S&E Field
 366th Fighter Group, 25 June – 14 September 1945
 Closed and Inactivated 30 September 1945

 R-29 Herzogenaurach, Germany
 Later: AAF Station Herzogenaurach
 Transferred to United States Army, 28 February 1946 (Herzo-Base); Closed 1992
 Now: Herzogenaurach Airport 
 Located: 
 Captured 19 April 1945, Wartime use: S&E Field
 354th Fighter Group, May 1945 – 15 February 1946
 320th Bombardment Group, 18 June – October 1945

 R-40 Bremen, Germany
 Later: AAF Station Bremen
 Now: Bremen Airport
 Located:  
 Opened:  30 April 1949
 Runway 1:  4115x164 CON 08/26  
 Runway 2:  3319x165 CON 13/31
 Runway 3:  2869x164 CON 18/36 
 Use: Supply and Evacuation Airfield

 R-42 Buchschwabach, Germany
 Later: AAF Station Buchschwabach
 Now: abandoned
 Located:    
 Captured 21 April 1945; Opened:  21 April – 31 August 1945
 Runway:  5000x120 SOD/PHS 08/26  
 Use: Supply and Evacuation Airfield
 368th Fighter Group, 13 May – 13 August 1945 (P-47)

 R-45 Ansbach, Germany
 Later: AAF Station Ansbach
 Transferred to United States Army control
 Now:  Katterbach Kaserne United States Army
 Located: 
 Captured: 23 April 1945 Opened: 29 April 1945
 Runway: 4000/120, PAP, (07/25)  
 Used by:
 354th Fighter Group, 30 April – 18 May 1945

 R-50 Stuttgart/Echterdingen, Germany
 Later: AAF Station Stuttgart/Echterdingen
 Now: Stuttgart Airport 
 Located: 
 Captured 25 April 1945, Opened 7 May 1945 
 324th Fighter Group, 8 May  – 20 October 1945
 404th Fighter Group, 23 June – 2 August 1945
 27th Fighter Group, 15 September – 20 October 1945
 371st Fighter Group, September – October 1945
 474th Fighter Group, 25 October – 21 November 1945
 Closed 30 November 1945 (Remains as USAF transport auxiliary airfield used occasionally by Air Mobility Command)

 R-54 Landsberg/East, Germany
 Later: AAF Station Landsberg
 Now:   Landsberg-Lech Air Base 
 Located: 
 Opened:  1 June – 31 August 1945 
 Runway: 3800x150 SOD (13/31) 
 Use: Military Storage Airfield

 R-56 Nordholz, Germany
 Later: AAF Station Nordholz
 Now: Nordholz Naval Airbase 
 Located: 
 Occupied 16 May 1945, Opened 5 June 1945 
 406th Fighter Group, 5 June 1945 – 20 August 1946
 86th Fighter Group, 20 August – 1 December 1946
 86th FG squadrons remained deployed to Nordholz AB on rotating basis until 31 December 1947 providing air defence of Bremen area.
 Closed 31 December 1947 (Remains in use as host to deployed USAF ACC/ANG fighter units to Germany)

 R-57 Bremerhaven, Germany
 Later: AAF Station Bremerhaven; Bremerhaven Army Airfield
 Located: 
 Opened:  16 May – 31 August 1945 Closed: 1993 
 Runway:  3200x250 SOD (06/24) 
 Use: Liaison Airfield

 R-67 Memmingen, Germany
 Later AAF Station Memmingen; Memmingen Air Base
 Now: Memmingen Airport
 Located:  
 Opened:  29 April – 15 June 1945
 Runway:  4089x250 CCN (06/24)  
 Use: Supply and Evacuation Airfield

 R-68 Straubing, Germany
 Later: AAF Station Straubing
 Transferred to United States Army, 31 August 1946 (Mansfield Kaserne)
 Now: Straubing Wallmuhle Airport 
 Located: 
 Captured 30 April 1945 Wartime use: S&E Field  
 405th Fighter Group, 8 May – July 1945
 362d Fighter Group, 12 May – August 1945
 368th Fighter Group, 13 August 1945 – 20 August 1946

 R-70 Kaufbeuren, Germany
 Later: AAF Station Kaufbeuren; Kaufbeuren Air Base
 Turned over to the German Air Force, 16 December 1957
 Now:   Fliegerhorst Kaufbeuren 
 Located:  
 Opened: 1 May 1945
 Runway: 5000x120 PSP (02/20)  
 Use: Supply & Evacuation/Fighter Bomber Airfield
 60th Troop Carrier Wing
 7320th Air Force Wing
 7330th Flying Training Wing

 R-71 Lechfeld, Germany
 Later: AAF Station Lechfeld
 Closed 1 June 1947, placed in standby status.
 Turned over to the German Air Force, 1 January 1956
 Now:   Fliegerhorst Lechfeld 
 Located:  
 Captured 1 May 1945, Opened 1 December 1945  
 305th Bombardment Group, December 1945 – December 1946
 306th Bombardment Group, 13–25 December 1946
 86th Fighter Group, 1 December 1946 – 5 March 1947

 R-72 Fürstenfeldbruck, Germany
 Later: AAF Station Fürstenfeldbruck; Fürstenfeldbruck Air Base
 Turned over to the German Air Force, 1960
 Now:   Fliegerhorst Fürstenfeldbruck 
 Located: 
 Opened: 2 May 1945
 Runway:  6000x150 CON (09/27)  
 Use: Supply & Evacuation Airfield
 36th Fighter-Bomber Wing
 117th Tactical Reconnaissance Wing
 10th Tactical Reconnaissance Wing
 7330th Flying Training Wing

 R-74 Oberwiesenfeld, Germany
 Was: Oberwiesenfeld Airport (Munich) (closed 1968)
 Later: AAF Station Oberwiesenfeld
 Transferred to control of the United States Army: Oberwiesenfeld Army Airfield
 Now: Olympiapark, Munich
 Located:    (approximately)
 Opened: 2 May 1945 – 1957
 Runway:  3000x120 SOD (14/32)  
 Use: Supply & Evacuation Airfield

 R-77 Gablingen, Germany
 Transferred to United States Army, 1 July 1946
 Was: Gablingen Kaserne
 Was: AAF Station Gablingen
 Now: Non-aviation use
 Located: 
 Captured 7 May 1945, Opened 15 May 1945  
 323d Bombardment Group, 15 May – 16 July 1945
 355th Fighter Group, 3 July 1945 – 15 April 1946

 R-78 Landsberg, Germany
 Later: AAF Station Landsberg; Landsberg Air Base
 Turned over to West German Luftwaffe (Bundesluftwaffe: federal air force) 31 December 1957
 Now:   Landsberg-Lech Air Base 
 Located: 
 Captured 7 May 1945, Wartime use: S&E Field, Tactical Air Depot  
 323d Bombardment Group, 16 July – October 1945
 34th Air Depot (later Air Ammunition Depot), 1 August 1945 – 31 December 1949
 2d Air Division, 10 June 1949 – 7 May 1951
 7280th/7030th Support Group, 1 January 1950 – 1 January 1954
 7351st Flying Training Wing (ATC), 1 January 1954 – 31 December 1957

 R-81 Oberpfaffenhofen, Germany
 Later: AAF Station Oberpfaffenhofen; Oberpfaffenhofen Air Depot
 Now: Oberpfaffenhofen Airport
 Located: 
 Opened:  5 May 1945
 Runway: 5000x150 CON (04/22)  
 Use:  Supply and Evacuation airfield; Tactical Air Depot

 R-82 Munich/Riem, Germany
 Later: AAF Station Munich-Riem; Munich Air Base
 Returned to German civil control: 30 June 1957
 Was: Munich-Riem Airport (Closed 16 May 1992)
 Now: non-aviation use
 Located: 
 Captured 6 May 1945, Wartime use: S&E Field, Tactical Air Depot  
 442d Troop Carrier Group, September 1945 – 30 September 1946
 60th Troop Carrier Group, 30 September 1946 – 14 May 1948 (elements at Munich AFB/AB until 1955)
 Munich Air Depot (ATSC), 1 February 1946 – 31 May 1948
 1602d Air Transport Wing (MATS), 1 June 1948 – 31 December 1956

 R-85 Munich/Neubiberg
 Later: AAF Station Munich-Neubiberg; Neubiberg Air Base
 Turned over to the German Air Force: 1 June 1958
 Now:   Neubiberg Air Base (Non-Flying)
 Located: 
 Occupied 15 May 1945, Opened 22 June 1945  
 70th Fighter Wing, 10 November 1945 – 25 September 1947
 357th Fighter Group, 21 July 1945 – 20 August 1946
 33d Fighter Group, 20 August 1946 – July 1947
 86th Fighter Group, 12 June 1947 – 9 August 1952
 317th Troop Carrier Group, 21 March 1953 – 17 April 1957
 7101st Air Base Group, 1 April 1957 – 1 June 1958

 R-87 Horsching, Austria
 Later: AAF Station Hoersching
 Located: 
 Turned over to Provisional Austrian Government, 1 July 1947
 Now: Linz Airport 
 Occupied: 5 May 1945, Wartime use: S&E Field  
 17th Bombardment Group, 27 June – 31 October 1945
 79th Fighter Group, July 1945 – 25 June 1947

 R-91 Erding, Germany
 Later AAF Station Erding
 Later Erding Air Base
 Turned over to the German Air Force, 1 April 1957
 Now:    Fliegerhorst Erding
 Located: 
 Opened:  15 August 1945
 Runway: 4500x120 PSP (08/26)  
 Use: Tactical Air Depot
 85th Air Depot Wing
 440th Fighter-Interceptor Squadron
 52d Tactical Fighter Group

 R-92 Vienna/Tulln, Austria
 Later: AAF Station Tulln
 Redesignated: Tulln Air Base, 26 September 1947
 Turned over to Austrian Government, 15 May 1955
 Now:   Fliegerhorst Brumowski 
 Located: 
 Occupied: 12 August 1945  
 1407th AAF Base Unit, 27 July 1945 – 31 May 1947
 516th Troop Carrier Group, 4 September 1945 – 20 December 1947
 313th Troop Carrier Group, 30 September 1946 – 25 June 1947
 7360th Base Complement Squadron, 1 June 1947 – 15 May 1955

 R-95 Tempelhof, Occupied Berlin
 Later: AAF Station Tempelhof; Tempelhof Airbase; Tempelhof Central Airport
 Until 2008 (now closed): Tempelhof Airport
 Located: 
 Opened: 10 July 1945 – July 1994
 Runway: 4987x120 PSP (08/26)  
 Use: Air Transport

 R-96 Erlangen, Germany
 Later: AAF Station Erlangen
 Turned over to United States Army (Ferris Barracks), 15 October 1947 
 Located: 
 Runway: 3000x75 PSP (04/22)  
 Headquarters:
 XII Tactical Air Command, 1 July – November 1945
 IX Fighter Command, September – November 1945
 40th Bombardment Wing, 15 November 1945 – 25 December 1946
 14th Liaison Squadron, 22 April – 4 May 1945

 R-98 Bad Kissingen, Germany
 Later: AAF Station Bad Kissingen
 Transferred to United States Army, 31 December 1947
 Now: Bad Kissingen Airfield,  
 Located: 
 Occupied: 7 April 1945, Opened 6 June 1945, Liaison Field  
 316th Station Complement Squadron, 6 June – 31 December 1945
 64th Fighter Wing, 1 December 1945 – 5 June 1947
 XII Tactical Air Command, 1 November 1945 – 10 November 1947
 86th Fighter Group, 5 March – 12 June 1947
 52d Fighter Group, 5 May – 25 June 1947
 33d Fighter Group, 15 July – August 1947

Royal Air Force ALGs

Advanced Landing Ground airfields built by the Royal Engineers or 2TAF's Airfield Construction service for the Royal Air Force and units under British operation command were given "B" designations. Some of these were also used by USAAF Troop Carrier Groups and Command and Control organisations.

 B-59 Ypres/Vlamertinghe, Belgium
 Located:   
 B-60 Grimberghen, Belgium
 Located: 
 B-61 SintDenijs-Westrem, Belgium
 Located:  
 B-62 (Re-designated as A-92 Sint-Truiden)
 B-63 Bruges/St. Croix, Belgium
 Located:  (approximately)
 B-64 Diest/Schaffen, Belgium
 Located:  (approximately)
 B-65 Maldegem, Belgium
 Located:   
 B-66 Blakenberg, Belgium
 Located:  
 B-67 Ursel, Belgium
 Located: 
( now a Belgian Air Force reserve base) (ICAO code EBUR)
 B-68 (Re-designated as A-89 Le Culot)
 B-69 Meerbeke, Belgium
 Located:  (approximately)
 B-70 Antwerp/Deurne, Belgium
 Now: Antwerp International Airport
 Located: 
 B-71 Coxyde, Belgium
 Located: 
 B-72 (Re-designated as A-75 Cambrai/Epinoy)
 B-73 Moorseele, Belgium
 Located: 
 B-74 (Re-designated as A-83 Denain/Prouvy)
 B-75 Nivelles, Belgium
 Located:  (approximately)
 B-76 Peer, Belgium
 Located: 
 B-77 Gilze/Rijen, Netherlands
 Located: 
 B-78 Eindhoven, Netherlands(also Vligerbasis Eindhoven) 
 Located: 
 B-79 Woensdrecht, Netherlands 
 Located: 
 B-80 Volkel, Netherlands
 Located: 
 B-81 Le Madrillet, France
  (approximately)
 Now: Technopôle du Madrillet in Saint-Étienne-du-Rouvray near Rouen
 B-82 Grave, Netherlands
 Located:  (approximately)
 B-83 Knokke-Le Zoute, Belgium
 Located:  
 B-84 Rips, Netherlands
 Located: 
 B-85 Schijndel, Netherlands
 Located:  (approximately)
 B-86 Helmond, Netherlands
 Located:  (approximately)
 B-87 Rosieres-en-Santerre, France 
 Located: 
 Runway 1: 5400x160 CON (04/22)
 Runway 2: 5300x160 CON (16/34)  
 RAF ALG, Assigned to USAAF 387th Bombardment Group, 24 May – November 1945
 B-88 Heesch, Netherlands
 Located:  (approximately)
 B-89 Mill, Netherlands
 Located:  (approximately)
 B-90 Kleine Brogel, Belgium
 Located:  (approximately)
 Now: Belgian Air Force Base Kleine Brogel
 B-91 Kluis, Netherlands 
 Located: 
 B-92 Abbeville/Drucat, France
 Located: 
 Runway: 4893x164 CON/ASP (09/27)
 Use:
 RAF ALG, Used by USAAF 61st Troop Carrier Group, 13 March – 19 May 1945
 B-93 Valkenburg aan de Geul, Netherlands
 Located:  (approximately)
 B-95 Teuge, Netherlands
 Located: 
 B-97 Amsterdam/Schiphol, Netherlands (IATA code AMS; ICAO code EHAM)
 Located: 
 B-100 Goch, Germany
 Later: RAF Laarbruch
 Located:  
 B-101 Nordhorn, Germany
 Located:  (approximately)
 B-102 Vorst, Germany
 Located:  (approximately)
 B-103 Plantlünne, Germany
 Located:  (approximately)
 Later: RAF Plantlünne 1945
 B-104 Damme, Germany
 Located:  (approximately)
 Later: Verkehrslandeplatz Damme (EDWC)
 B-105 Drope, Germany
 Located:  (approximately)
 B-106 Twente/Enschede, Netherlands
 Located: 
 B-107 Lingen, Germany
 Located:  (approximately)
 B-108 Rheine, Germany
 Located: 
 B-109 Quakenbrück, Germany
 Now: Quakenbrück Glider Airfield
 Located: 
 B-110 Achmer, Germany
 Located: 
 B-111 Ahlhorn, Germany
 became Fliegerhorst Ahlhorn (ICAO code EDNA) closed early 1990s
 Located: 
 B-112 Hopsten, Germany 
 became Fliegerhorst Hopsten (ICAO EDNP-later ETNP)
 Located:  
 B-113 Varrelbusch, Germany
 Located: 
 B-114 Diepholz, Germany
 Located:  
 B-115 Melle, Germany
 Located:  (approximately)
 B-116 Wunstorf, Germany 
 Located:  
 B-117 Jever, Germany
 Located: 
 B-118 Celle, Germany
 Located: 
 B-119 Wahn, Germany
 Located:  (approximately)
 Later: RAF Wahn 1945
 Now: Flughafen Köln-Bonn "Konrad Adenauer"
 B-120 Hanover/Langenhagen, Germany
 Located: 
 B-150 Hustedt, Germany
 Located:  (approximately)
 B-151 Bückeburg, Germany
 Located: 
 B-152 Fassberg, Germany
 Located: 
 B-153 Bad Oeynhausen, Germany
 Located:  (approximately)
 B-154 Reinsehlen, Germany
 Located: 
 B-155 Dedelstorf, Germany
 Now: Segelfluggelände Glider Airfield
 Located: 
 B-156 Luneburg, Germany - now Lüneburg Airfield
 Located:  (approximately)
 B-157 Werl, Germany
 Located:  (approximately)
 B-158 Lübeck, Germany
 Located: 
 B-159 Mahlen, Germany (Undetermined)
 B-160 Copenhagen/Kastrup, Denmark
 Located: 
 B-162 Stade, Germany
 Located:  (approximately)
 B-163 Dortmund, Germany
 Located: 
 B-164 Schleswigland, Germany
 Located: 
 Later: RAF Schleswigland 1945
 Now: Fliegerhorst Schleswig (alt. Fliegerhorst Jagel)
 B-166 Flensburg, Germany
 Located: 
 B-167 Kiel/Holtenau, Germany
 Located: 
 B-168 Hamburg/Fuhlsbuttel, Germany
 Located: 
 B-170 Westerland, Germany
 Located: 
 B-172 Husum, Germany
 Located:  
 B-174 Uetersen, Germany
 Located:

See also

 ALG Wormhout

Notes

References
Johnson, David C. (1988), U.S. Army Air Forces Continental Airfields (ETO), D-Day to V-E Day; Research Division, USAF Historical Research Center, Maxwell AFB, Alabama.

War Diary 689 Coy Royal Engineers August 1945 
War Diary 16th Airfield Construction Group August 1945

External links

Normandy ALGs
Abandoned, Forgotten and Little Known Airfields in Europe
 La 9th U.S. Army Air Force en Normandie (French and English)

 Advanced Landing Ground
 Advanced Landing Ground